Apocalyptic fiction is a subgenre of science fiction that is concerned with the end of civilization due to a potentially existential catastrophe such as nuclear warfare, pandemic, extraterrestrial attack, impact event, cybernetic revolt, technological singularity, dysgenics, supernatural phenomena, divine judgment, climate change, resource depletion or some other general disaster. Post-apocalyptic fiction is set in a world or civilization after such a disaster. The time frame may be immediately after the catastrophe, focusing on the travails or psychology of survivors, or considerably later, often including the theme that the existence of pre-catastrophe civilization has been forgotten (or mythologized).
 
Apocalypse is a Greek word referring to the end of the world. Apocalypticism is the religious belief that there will be an apocalypse, a term which originally referred to a revelation of God's will, but now usually refers to belief that the world will come to an end very soon, even within one's own lifetime.

Apocalyptic fiction does not portray catastrophes, or disasters, or near-disasters that do not result in apocalypse. A threat of an apocalypse does not make a piece of fiction apocalyptic. For example, Armageddon and Deep Impact are considered disaster films and not apocalyptic fiction because, although Earth or humankind are terribly threatened, in the end they manage to avoid destruction. Apocalyptic fiction is not the same as fiction that provides visions of a dystopian future. George Orwell's Nineteen Eighty-Four, for example, is dystopian fiction, not apocalyptic fiction.

Works of apocalyptic and post-apocalyptic fiction

{| class="wikitable sortable"
|-
!|Format
!|Year
!|Cause
!|Title
!|Author 
!|Notes
|- style="vertical-align:top;"
|Novel
|13th century
|Impact event
|Theologus Autodidactus
|Ibn al-Nafis
|

|- style="vertical-align:top;"
|Novel
|1805
|Human decline
|Le Dernier Homme
|Jean-Baptiste Cousin de Grainville
|Regarded as the first story of modern speculative fiction to depict the end of the world

|- style="vertical-align:top;"
|Poem
|1816
|Sun
|"Darkness"
|Lord Byron
|Describes the end of life on Earth after the Sun's extinction

|- style="vertical-align:top;"
|Novel
|1826
|Disease
|The Last Man
|Mary Shelley
|

|- style="vertical-align:top;"
|Novel
|1872
|Technology
|"The Book of Machines"
|
|The novel Erewhon section "The Book of Machines"

|- style="vertical-align:top;"
|Novel
|1885
|War
|After London
|Richard Jefferies
|The nature of the catastrophe is never stated, except that apparently most of the human race quickly dies out, leaving England to revert to nature

|- style="vertical-align:top;"
|Novel
|1895
|Sun
|The Time Machine
|H. G. Wells
|Towards the end of the book the Time Traveler witnesses the Sun's expansion, causing the death of all life on Earth.

|- style="vertical-align:top;"
|Novel
|1898
|Aliens
|The War of the Worlds
|H. G. Wells
|

|- style="vertical-align:top;"
|Novel
|1901
|Eco
|The Purple Cloud
|M. P. Shiel
|A volcanic eruption floods the world with cyanide gas.

|- style="vertical-align:top;"
|Story
|1906
|Sun
|"Finis"
|Frank Lillie Pollock
|Where a second Sun's light incinerates Earth

|- style="vertical-align:top;"
|Novel
|1908
|Supernatural
|Lord of the World
|Robert Hugh Benson
|

|- style="vertical-align:top;"
|Story
|1909
|Technology
|The Machine Stops
|E. M. Forster
|A short story emphasizing machinery instead of computers

|- style="vertical-align:top;"
|Novel
|1912
|Disease
|The Scarlet Plague
|Jack London
|Sixty years after an uncontrollable epidemic named the Red Death has depopulated the planet, James Howard Smith tries to impart the value of knowledge and wisdom to his grandsons

|- style="vertical-align:top;"
|Novel
|1912
|Sun
|The Night Land
|William Hope Hodgson
|The Sun burns out and the last of humanity is sheltered in an arcology from the hostile environment and the creatures adapted for it

|- style="vertical-align:top;"
|Novel
|1913
|Disease
|Goslings: A World of Women
|J. D. Beresford
|A global plague has decimated England's male population and the once-predictable Gosling family is now free to fulfill its long-frustrated desires

|- style="vertical-align:top;"
|Novel
|1914
|Unspecified
|Darkness and Dawn
|George Allan England
|Two characters wake from suspended animation and find that some great disaster has torn an enormous chasm in Earth and created a second Moon

|- style="vertical-align:top;"
|Novel
|1916
|War
|The Lost Continent
|Edgar Rice Burroughs
|

|- style="vertical-align:top;"
|Play
|1921
|Technology
|R.U.R.
|Karel Čapek
|Notable for coining the term "robot"

|- style="vertical-align:top;"
|Novel
|1926
|Aliens
|The Moon Men
|Edgar Rice Burroughs
|The series comprising The Moon Maid, with the action set on the Moon; The Moon Men, set in 2120 after the Kalkars have invaded Earth; and The Red Hawk, which jumps to 2430 and in which the Great Feud reaches its climax.

|- style="vertical-align:top;"
|Novel
|1922
|War
|Theodore Savage (vt. Lest Ye Die)
|E. F. Bleiler, Richard Bleiler, Cicely Hamilton.
|Science-Fiction: The Early Years. Kent State University Press, 1990. (p.331). .

|- style="vertical-align:top;"
|Film
|1924
|Disease
|The Last Man on Earth
|
|A disease kills all men over 14 years old, but 10 years later, one is found still alive and hilarity ensues. Based on the 1923 novelette of the same name by John D. Swain. Was remade in 1933 as the musical It's Great to Be Alive.

|- style="vertical-align:top;"
|Novel
|1926
|Technology
|The Metal Giants
|Edmond Hamilton
|

|- style="vertical-align:top;"
|Novel
| data-sort-value="1928" | 1928, 1929
|Eco
|Deluge and Dawn
|S. Fowler Wright
|A huge flood devastates the world; only the English Midlands survive

|- style="vertical-align:top;"
|Novel
|1929
|Technology
|Automata
|S. Fowler Wright
|

|- style="vertical-align:top;"
|Novel
|1931
|Technology
|The War of the Giants
|Fletcher Pratt
|

|- style="vertical-align:top;"
|Novel
|1932
|War
|Tomorrow's Yesterday
|John Gloag
|

|- style="vertical-align:top;"
|Film
|1933
|Eco
|Deluge
|
|Deluge is a 1933 American apocalyptic science fiction film, directed by Felix E. Feist and released by RKO Radio Pictures.

|- style="vertical-align:top;"
|Novel
|1933
|War
|The Shape of Things to Come
|Wells, H. G.
|Predicting an extended world war fought with modern scientific weapons, societal upheaval, and the beginning of space travel. Filmed as Things to Come in 1936.

|- style="vertical-align:top;"
|Novel
|1934
|War
|Quinzinzinzili
|Régis Messac
|Predicting a great world war that ends with the vanishing of humanity. Only a group of children survives and forms a strange new humanity.

|- style="vertical-align:top;"
|Novel
|1934
|War
|The Black Flame
|Stanley G. Weinbaum
|Comprises two novellas, Dawn of Flame and The Black Flame, with a common character, Black Margot, a.k.a. Margaret of Urbs, a.k.a. the Black Flame

|- style="vertical-align:top;"
|Story
|1934
|Technology
|"Rex"
|Harl Vincent
|

|- style="vertical-align:top;"
|Novel
|1935
|Technology
|Nightmare Number Three
|Stephen Vincent Benet
|

|- style="vertical-align:top;"
|Film
|1936
|War
|Things to Come
|
|A future Second World War leads to a breakdown of civilization in most of the world, with technology returning to medieval levels by 1970.

|- style="vertical-align:top;"
|Novel
|1936
|War
|Wild Harbour
|Ian MacPherson
|A war much worse than World War I leads to complete social collapse in Great Britain

|- style="vertical-align:top;"
|Story
|1937
|War
|By the Waters of Babylon
|Stephen Vincent Benét
|

|- style="vertical-align:top;"
|Radio
| data-sort-value="1938" | 1938, 1943
|Eco
|"Oxychloride X"
|Arch Oboler
|An episode of Oboler's popular 1930s and 1940s radio horror and mystery anthology serial Lights Out. A deranged university chemistry student creates what turns out to be a "super-dissolving substance", with the potential, among other uses, to become "a doomsday chemical superweapon".

|- style="vertical-align:top;"
|Radio
|1938, 1968–1973
|Aliens
|"The War of the Worlds"
|Orson Welles
|The radio play, originally directed and narrated by Welles and premiered on The Mercury Theater on the Air, later remade for local broadcast by, and over, station WKBW (now WWKB)-AM, in Buffalo, New York.

|- style="vertical-align:top;"
|Novel
|1939
|War
|The Death Guard
|Philip George Chadwick
|When a near-invincible army of artificially created soldiers – the Flesh Guard – falls into the hands of an untrustworthy power, continental Europe forms an alliance and invades Great Britain. The resulting carnage, involving poisonous electric gas, "humanite" (atomic) bombs, and the unfeeling march of the Flesh Guard, reduces whole cities and towns in Europe to smoking rubble.

|- style="vertical-align:top;"
|Film
|1939
|War
|Peace on Earth
|Hugh Harman 
|A cartoon short where animals rebuild a post-apocalyptic world after humanity has fought war to the point of extinction

|- style="vertical-align:top;"
|Story
|1941
|War
|"Magic City"
|Nelson S. Bond
|

|- style="vertical-align:top;"
|Story
|1941
|War
|"Nightfall"
|Isaac Asimov
|

|- style="vertical-align:top;"
|Play
|1942
|War (also ice age and flood)
|The Skin of Our Teeth
|Thornton Wilder
|

|- style="vertical-align:top;"
|Novel
|1943
|War
|Gather, Darkness
|Fritz Leiber
|

|- style="vertical-align:top;"
|Story
|1944
|Eco
|"The Great Fog"
|Gerald Heard
|A mildew-generated fog appears to undermine civilization.

|- style="vertical-align:top;"
|Novel
|1945
|Sun
|Rescue Party
|Arthur C. Clarke
|

|- style="vertical-align:top;"
|Radio
|1946
|War
|The Fifth Horseman (radio play)
|
|Early (post-World War II) radio docudrama series originally aired over the now-defunct NBC Radio network. This "rare and unusual" series of shows (featuring many top Hollywood film performers of that era) was written, produced, and directed by Arnold Marquis, as part of a special postwar campaign aimed at convincing the public to place the then-newly developed technologies of nuclear energy and weaponry under United Nations control.

|- style="vertical-align:top;"
|Novel
|1946
|Eco
|Mr. Adam
|Pat Frank
|Depicts a world in which a nuclear power plant explosion renders the entire male population infertile

|- style="vertical-align:top;"
|Novel
|1947
|Technology
|With Folded Hands
|Jack Williamson
|

|- style="vertical-align:top;"
|Novel, Screenplay
|1948
|War
|Ape and Essence
|Aldous Huxley
|

|- style="vertical-align:top;"
|Story
|1949
|War
|"Let the Ants Try"
|Frederik Pohl (under the pseudonym James MacCreigh)
|

|- style="vertical-align:top;"
|Novel
|1949
|Disease
|Earth Abides
|George R. Stewart
|

|- style="vertical-align:top;"
|Story
|1949
|War
|"Not with a Bang"
|Damon Knight
|

|- style="vertical-align:top;"
|Story
|1949
|Impact Event
|"The Big Eye"
|Max Simon Ehrlich
|

|- style="vertical-align:top;"
|Story
|1949
|War
|"Time to Rest"
|John Wyndham
|Short story sequel "No Place Like Earth"

|- style="vertical-align:top;"
|Novel
|1950
|War
|Shadow on the Hearth
|Judith Merril
|Later adapted for television in 1954

|- style="vertical-align:top;"
|Novel
|1950
|War
|Pebble in the Sky
|Isaac Asimov
|A later book, Robots and Empire, gave a different explanation

|- style="vertical-align:top;"
|Story
|1950
|War
|"Dear Devil"
|Eric Frank Russell
|

|- style="vertical-align:top;"
|Story
|1950
|War
|"There Will Come Soft Rains"
|Ray Bradbury
|Short story in The Martian Chronicles.

|- style="vertical-align:top;"
|Story
|1950
|Disease
|"The City"
|Ray Bradbury
|

|- style="vertical-align:top;"
|Radio
|1951
|War
|"The Last Objective"
|Paul Carter
|Adapted by Ernest Kinoy for NBC Radio's 1950–1951 sci-fi anthology series, Dimension X. A military android questions its continued existence, after the last of its human comrade-counterparts dies out from the effects of a mysterious doomsday super-weapon that was unleashed at the end of a generations-long global atomic war.

|- style="vertical-align:top;"
|Film
|1951
|War
|Five
|Arch Oboler
|The film shows the aftermath of a nuclear war, centered on a group of five survivors

|- style="vertical-align:top;"
|Story
|1951
|Disease
|"The Visitor"
|Ray Bradbury
|Short story in The Illustrated Man

|- style="vertical-align:top;"
|Film
|1951
|Impact Event
|When Worlds Collide
|
|Scientists discover that a star named Bellus is on a collision course with Earth.

|- style="vertical-align:top;"
|Novel
|1951
|Impact Event, Monsters, Disease
|The Day of the Triffids
|John Wyndham
|Initially thought to be a blinding meteor shower, but later suggested to be a man-made satellite based weapon accidentally discharged, allowing the bio-engineered Triffids (a type of plant) to dominate

|- style="vertical-align:top;"
|Novel
|1951
|Aliens
|The Puppet Masters
|Robert A. Heinlein
|

|- style="vertical-align:top;"
|Story
|1951
|Technology
|"The Last Revolution"
|Lord Dunsany
|

|- style="vertical-align:top;"
|Novel
|1951
|Social Collapse
|Foundation
|Asimov, Isaac
|Mathematician Hari Seldon foresees the fall of the Galactic Empire, which encompasses the entire Milky Way

|- style="vertical-align:top;"
|Film
|1952
|War
|Captive Women
|
|A new primitive society emerges long after a nuclear war. The film portrays tribes called the "Norms", the "Upriver People", and the "Mutates" fighting in the remains of New York City.

|- style="vertical-align:top;"
|Film
|1952
|War
|Invasion USA
|
|

|- style="vertical-align:top;"
|Novel
|1952
|War
|Star Man's Son
|Andre Norton
|Also published as Daybreak: 2250 A.D. and Star Man's Son: 2250 A.D.

|- style="vertical-align:top;"
|Story
|1952
|Eco
|"The Birds"
|Daphne du Maurier
|Made into the 1963 film The Birds by Alfred Hitchcock, in which birds begin launching spontaneous mass attacks against humanity

|- style="vertical-align:top;"
|Novel
|1952
|Human decline
|City
|Clifford D. Simak
|

|- style="vertical-align:top;"
|Story
|1953
|War
|"Second Variety"
|Philip K. Dick
|

|- style="vertical-align:top;"
|Film
|1953
|Aliens
|The War of the Worlds
|
|Based on the H. G. Wells novel of the same name

|- style="vertical-align:top;"
|Novel
|1953
|Aliens
|The Kraken Wakes
|John Wyndham
|

|- style="vertical-align:top;"
|Novel
|1953
|Future collapse
|Against the Fall of Night
|Arthur C. Clarke
|An early version of The City and the Stars

|- style="vertical-align:top;"
|Story
|1953
|Supernatural
|"The Nine Billion Names of God"
|Arthur C. Clarke
|A short story taken from the short story collection of the same name

|- style="vertical-align:top;"
|Novel
|1953
|Human decline
|Childhood's End
|Arthur C. Clarke
|

|- style="vertical-align:top;"
|Novel
|1954
|War
|Tomorrow!
|Philip Wylie
|Cautionary (for its time) civil defense-themed "tale of two cities": one (fictional) American city is ready for nuclear World War III, while the other is not

|- style="vertical-align:top;"
|Play
|1954
|War
|The Offshore Island
|Marghanita Laski
|

|- style="vertical-align:top;"
|Novel
|1954
|Disease
|I Am Legend
|Richard Matheson
|A vampire apocalypse novel, adapted to film as The Last Man on Earth (1964), The Omega Man (1971), I Am Legend (2007), and I Am Omega (2007)

|- style="vertical-align:top;"
|Novel
|1954
|Disease
|Some Will Not Die
|Algis Budrys
|

|- style="vertical-align:top;"
|Story
|1954
|Technology
|"Slaves To The Metal Horde"
|Milton Lesser
|

|- style="vertical-align:top;"
|Story
|1954
|Technology
|"Answer"
|Fredric Brown
|

|- style="vertical-align:top;"
|Story
|1954
|Social Collapse
|"The Last of the Masters"
|Philip K. Dick 
|Short story (novelette) taking place 200 years after a global anarchist revolution, where society has stagnated due to the loss of scientific knowledge during the revolt. Elsewhere, the last government, a highly centralized and efficient society, is in hiding from the Anarchist League, a global militia preventing the recreation of any government.

|- style="vertical-align:top;"
|Film
|1955
|War
|Day the World Ended
|Danel Wojick
|

|- style="vertical-align:top;"
|Novel
|1955
|War
|The Chrysalids
|John Wyndham 
|U.S. title: Re-Birth - the aftermath of a nuclear war in a rural Canadian community

|- style="vertical-align:top;"
|Novel
|1955
|War
|The Long Tomorrow
|Leigh Brackett
|In the aftermath of a nuclear war scientific knowledge is feared and restricted.

|- style="vertical-align:top;"
|Film
|1956
|War
|World Without End
|Edward Bernd
|Starring Hugh Marlowe, Rod Taylor – robust 20th Century men — narrowly escaping the ubiquitous "time warp" — kill giant spiders, help pale nerds and their beautiful women emerge from underground, and retake the post-World War III surface from troglodyte mutants

|- style="vertical-align:top;"
|Novel
|1956
|War
|The World Jones Made
|Philip K. Dick
|

|- style="vertical-align:top;"
|Story
|1956
|Human decline
|To Serve The Master
|Philip K. Dick
|

|- style="vertical-align:top;"
|Story
|1956
|War
|"The Last Word"
|Damon Knight
|

|- style="vertical-align:top;"
|Story
|1956
|Impact Event
|"A Pail of Air"
|Fritz Leiber
|A small family struggles to survive at temperatures near absolute zero after Earth is ripped from its solar orbit

|- style="vertical-align:top;"
|Film
|1956
|Aliens
|Invasion of the Body Snatchers
|
|Based on the novel The Body Snatchers by Jack Finney

|- style="vertical-align:top;"
|Novel
|1956
|Future collapse
|The City and the Stars
|Arthur C. Clarke
|After the loss of a galactic empire, humanity is restricted to the single city of Diaspar, but lives a life of eternal comfort and safety. Alvin escapes and finds the truth – forcing his city to face the universe again.

|- style="vertical-align:top;"
|Novel
|1956
|Eco
|The Death of Grass
|John Christopher
|A virus that destroys plants causes massive famine and the breakdown of society. Made into the film No Blade of Grass

|- style="vertical-align:top;"
|Poem
|1956
|War
|"The Horses"
|Edwin Muir
|Deals with society's regression to pre-Industrial Revolution conditions in the wake of a nuclear war

|- style="vertical-align:top;"
|Novel
|1957
|War
|On the Beach
|Nevil Shute
|Also the films based on the book

|- style="vertical-align:top;"
|Novel
|1957
|Social Collapse
|Atlas Shrugged
|Ayn Rand
|American society slowly collapses after the country's leading industrialists mysteriously disappear

|- style="vertical-align:top;"
|Film
|1958
|War
|Teenage Caveman
|
|

|- style="vertical-align:top;"
|Novel
|1958
|Eco
|The Year When Stardust Fell
|Raymond F. Jones
|The world's machinery grinds to a halt after comet dust arrives

|- style="vertical-align:top;"
|Film
|1958
|War
|Terror from the Year 5000
|
|

|- style="vertical-align:top;"
|Television
|1958
|War
|"Doomsday For Dyson"
|J. B. Priestley
|A made-for-television play. Tom Dyson is suddenly caught up in the chaos of a nuclear war. Several of the issues brought up in the programme were discussed in an hour-long debate following its conclusion.

|- style="vertical-align:top;"
|Television
|1958
|War
|"Underground"
|
|A group of survivors from an atomic war become trapped in an underground station; during the play, broadcast live on Armchair Theatre, one of the actors (Gareth Jones) actually died while the show was on the air.

|- style="vertical-align:top;"
|Novel
|1958
|War
|Red Alert
|Peter George
|Filmed as Dr. Strangelove or: How I Learned to Stop Worrying and Love the Bomb by Stanley Kubrick

|- style="vertical-align:top;"
|Poem
|1958–1970
|Human decline
|"Bedtime Story"
|George MacBeth
|A poem from Collected Poems 1958–1970

|- style="vertical-align:top;"
|Film
|1959
|War
|On the Beach
|Stanley Kramer
|Starring Gregory Peck, Fred Astaire, Anthony Perkins and Ava Gardner – the crew of an American submarine finds temporary safety from the fallout in Australia after the nuclear holocaust (from the 1957 novel by Nevil Shute)

|- style="vertical-align:top;"
|Film
|1959
|War
|The World, the Flesh and the Devil
|
|Adapted from M.P. Shiel's The Purple Cloud.

|- style="vertical-align:top;"
|Story
|1959
|Future collapse
|"Transfusion"
|Chad Oliver
|

|- style="vertical-align:top;"
|Television
|1959
|War
|The Offshore Island
|Marghanita Laski
|A TV adaptation of a play by Laski.

|- style="vertical-align:top;"
|Film
|1959
|Eco, monsters
|The Giant Behemoth
|
|

|- style="vertical-align:top;"
|Novel
|1959
|War
|Alas, Babylon
|Pat Frank
|The aftermath of a nuclear war in a rural Florida community

|- style="vertical-align:top;"
|Novel
|1959
|War
|A Canticle for Leibowitz
|Walter M. Miller, Jr.
|Plus a sequel called Saint Leibowitz and the Wild Horse Woman (1997)

|- style="vertical-align:top;"
|Novel
|1959
|War
|Level 7
|Mordecai Roshwald
|

|- style="vertical-align:top;"
|Film
|1959
|War
|The Final War
|Shigeaki Hidaka
|A Japanese film about a third world war that is started when the U.S. accidentally drops a nuclear bomb on South Korea (Japanese title: Dai-sanji sekai taisen: Yonju-ichi jikan no kyofu)

|- style="vertical-align:top;"
|Television
|1959–1987
|War
|The Twilight Zone – numerous episodes and its revivals
|
|"Time Enough at Last" (1959); "Two" (1961); "The Old Man in the Cave" (1963); "A Little Peace and Quiet" (1985); "Quarantine" (1986); "Shelter Skelter" (1987); and "Voices in the Earth" (1987)

|- style="vertical-align:top;"
|Film
|1960
|War
|Atomic War Bride
|
|A Yugoslavian science fiction drama film directed by Veljko Bulajic.

|- style="vertical-align:top;"
|Film
|1960
|War
|The Time Machine
|
|had an atomic war explain the downfall of civilization

|- style="vertical-align:top;"
|Film
|1960
|Eco
|The Last Woman on Earth
|
|The Earth's oxygen levels drop suddenly, suffocating most life–survivors in an oxygen-producing jungle. It is speculated that this happened because of "a bigger and better bomb", but the reasons are not made clear.
|- style="vertical-align:top;"

|Film
|1960
|Eco
|Beyond the Time Barrier
|
|X-plane arrives in future after solar radiation catastrophe

|- style="vertical-align:top;"
|Film
|1961
|War
|The Last War
|Shūe Matsubayashi
|A Japanese film about World War III (Japanese title: Sekai daisenso)

|- style="vertical-align:top;"
|Novel
|1961
|War
|Dark Universe
|Daniel F Galouye
|

|- style="vertical-align:top;"
|Film
|1961
|Eco
|Voyage to the Bottom of the Sea
|
|The Van Allen belt catches on fire.

|- style="vertical-align:top;"
|Poem
|1961
|War
|"Your Attention Please"
|Peter Porter
|Written in the style of a radio broadcast warning of an impending nuclear attack

|- style="vertical-align:top;"
|Novel
|1961
|Eco
|The Wind from Nowhere
|J. G. Ballard
|Ballard's first published novel. The world is destroyed by increasingly powerful winds.

|- style="vertical-align:top;"
|Film
|1962
|War
|La jetée
|Chris Marker
|

|- style="vertical-align:top;"
|Film
|1962
|War
|Panic in Year Zero!
|
|A 1962 movie about a family that escapes Los Angeles after the city is devastated by a nuclear attack.

|- style="vertical-align:top;"
|Film
|1962
|War
|This Is Not a Test
|
|

|- style="vertical-align:top;"
|Film
|1962
|Impact Event, Monsters
|The Day of the Triffids
|
|Loosely based on the John Wyndham novel of the same name. The film version of the Triffids are poisonous space-borne plants, and arrive on Earth via meteorites.

|- style="vertical-align:top;"
|Novel
|1962
|Eco
|Hothouse
|Brian Aldiss
|Presents a dying Earth where vegetation dominates and animal life is all but extinct. Originally published in the United States in abridged form as The Long, Hot Afternoon of Earth.

|- style="vertical-align:top;"
|Novel
|1962
|Eco
|The Drowned World
|J. G. Ballard
|Climate change causes flooding

|- style="vertical-align:top;"
|Novel
|1962
|Eco
|The Wanting Seed
|Anthony Burgess
|Global overpopulation and famine leads to mass chaos

|- style="vertical-align:top;"
|Novel
|1962
|Eco
|The World in Winter (U.K.)/The Long Winter(U.S.)
|John Christopher
|A decrease in radiation from the sun causes a new ice age

|- style="vertical-align:top;"
|Novel
|1963
|War
|Triumph
|Philip Wylie
|

|- style="vertical-align:top;"
|Novel
|1963
|Future collapse
|Space Viking
|H. Beam Piper
|

|- style="vertical-align:top;"
|Novel
|1963
|Eco
|Cat's Cradle
|Kurt Vonnegut
|All the water on Earth (including that within living people) is exposed to and becomes Ice-Nine, a fictional alternative structure of water that is solid at room temperature

|- style="vertical-align:top;"
|Novel
|1963
|Future collapse
|The Dragon Masters
|Jack Vance
|

|- style="vertical-align:top;"
|Comic
|1963
|Technology
|Magnus, Robot Fighter
|
|Comic book series by Gold Key Comics

|- style="vertical-align:top;"
|Novel
|1963
|Human decline
|Planet of the Apes
|Pierre Boulle
|

|- style="vertical-align:top;"
|Novel
|1963
|Unspecified
|The Wall
|Marlen Haushofer
|Adapted to film in 2012 under the same name. A 40-something woman, while vacationing in a hunting lodge in the Austrian mountains, discovers that a transparent wall has been placed that closes her off from the outside world; all life outside the wall appears to have died, possibly in a nuclear event.

|- style="vertical-align:top;"
|Film
|1963
|Eco
|The Birds
|
|Loosely based on the 1952 story of the same name by Daphne du Maurier, it focuses on a series of sudden and unexplained violent bird attacks on the people of Bodega Bay, California, over the course of a few days.

|- style="vertical-align:top;"
|Film
|1964
|War
|Dr. Strangelove or: How I Learned to Stop Worrying and Love the Bomb
|Stanley Kubrick
|Adaptation of the novel Red Alert by Peter George

|- style="vertical-align:top;"
|Film
|1964
|Disease
|The Last Man on Earth
|
|The first film adaptation based on Richard Matheson's 1954 novel I Am Legend.

|- style="vertical-align:top;"
|Film
|1964
|War
|The Time Travelers
|
|

|- style="vertical-align:top;"
|Novel
|1964
|Disease
|Virus
|Sakyo Komatsu
|Novel about a lethal super-germ that kills humanity in months; later adapted into a 1980 movie

|- style="vertical-align:top;"
|Film
|1964
|Eco
|Crack in the World
|
|Deep-drilling project goes wrong

|- style="vertical-align:top;"
|Novel
|1964
|War
|Davy
|Edgar Pangborn
|

|- style="vertical-align:top;"
|Novel
|1964
|War
|Farnham's Freehold
|Robert A. Heinlein
|

|- style="vertical-align:top;"
|Novel
|1964
|War
|The Penultimate Truth
|Philip K. Dick
|

|- style="vertical-align:top;"
|Television
|1964
|Aliens
|"The Dalek Invasion of Earth"
|
|A Doctor Who serial; as well as other alien invasions in the 1963–1989 run, including in 1966 "The Tenth Planet", 1968 "The Web of Fear" and in the same year "The Invasion", in 1970 "Spearhead from Space", and in 1971 "Terror of the Autons"; this list is not complete but can be said to represent milestone episodes. Some notable examples from the relaunch are in 2006 "Army of Ghosts"/"Doomsday", and in 2007 "The Sound of Drums"/"Last of the Time Lords" (though it could be argued that only the Master is an alien).

|- style="vertical-align:top;"
|Film
|1964
|Eco
|The Day the Earth Caught Fire
|
|Earth starts hurtling toward the Sun as a result of man's nuclear testing

|- style="vertical-align:top;"
|Novel
|1964
|Eco
|The Drought
|J. G. Ballard
|A super-drought evaporates all water on Earth

|- style="vertical-align:top;"
|Novel
|1964
|Eco
|Greybeard
|Brian Aldiss
|The human race becomes sterile

|- style="vertical-align:top;"
|Novel
|1964
|Eco
|Time of the Great Freeze
|Robert Silverberg
|Another ice age has engulfed Earth. A group from New York travels over the ice to London in the year 2650.

|- style="vertical-align:top;"
|Television
|1964–2002
|War
|The Outer Limits
|
|"Soldier" (cited as an influence on the movie The Terminator); "Bits of Love"; "The Human Factor"; "The Vaccine"

|- style="vertical-align:top;"
|Television
|1965
|War
|The War Game
|Peter Watkins
|

|- style="vertical-align:top;"
|Novel
|1965
|War
|Dr. Bloodmoney, or How We Got Along After the Bomb
|Philip K. Dick
|

|- style="vertical-align:top;"
|Game
|1965
|War
|Nuclear War Card Game
|
|Game by Flying Buffalo. A comical cataclysmic card game for 2–6 players of all ages.

|- style="vertical-align:top;"
|Novel
|1965
|Aliens
|The Genocides
|Thomas M. Disch
|Alien flora is seeded on Earth, and quickly comes to dominate all landmasses, threatening humanity with extinction

|- style="vertical-align:top;"
|Novel
|1965
|Eco
|A Wrinkle in the Skin (The Ragged Edge (U.S.))
|John Christopher
|Civilization destroyed by massive worldwide earthquakes

|- style="vertical-align:top;"
|Film
|1965
|Technology
|Alphaville, une étrange aventure de Lemmy Caution
|
|

|- style="vertical-align:top;"
|Story
|1965
|Technology
|The Cyberiad
|Stanisław Lem
|A collection of humorous short stories

|- style="vertical-align:top;"
|Television
|1966
|War
|Ape and Essence
|
|Television adaptation of the novel of the same name

|- style="vertical-align:top;"
|Film
|1966
|Aliens
|Daleks - Invasion Earth 2150 AD
|
|Based loosely on "The Dalek Invasion of Earth', an early serial of the BBC television series Doctor Who, but not part of the official canon

|- style="vertical-align:top;"
|Novel
|1966
|Eco
|The Crystal World
|J. G. Ballard
|The jungle in Africa starts to crystallize all life and expands outward

|- style="vertical-align:top;"
|Novel
|1966
|Eco
|Make Room! Make Room!
|Harry Harrison
|Made into the 1973 film Soylent Green directed by Richard Fleischer – showing a world where humanity has become massively overpopulated, a vague ecological disaster is creating a growing dust bowl, and the entire economy is collapsing

|- style="vertical-align:top;"
|Novel
|1966, 1974, 1977
|Technology
|Colossus
|Dennis Feltham Jones
|Plus two sequels called The Fall of Colossus (1974) and Colossus and the Crab (1977)

|- style="vertical-align:top;"
|Novel series
|1967–1988
|Aliens
|The Tripods
|John Christopher
|Made into a TV series in the 1980s

|- style="vertical-align:top;"
|Film
|1967
|War
|Late August at the Hotel OzoneCz. Konec srpna v Hotelu Ozon
|
|

|- style="vertical-align:top;"
|Film
|1967
|War
|In the Year 2889
|
|A remake of the 1955 Roger Corman film Day the World Ended that is set in the year 1977, despite the title.

|- style="vertical-align:top;"
|Film
|1967
|War
|Journey to the Center of Time
|
|

|- style="vertical-align:top;"
|Novel
|1967
|War
|Ice
|Anna Kavan
|Earth threatened by a nuclear winter

|- style="vertical-align:top;"
|Story
|1967
|Technology
|"I Have No Mouth, and I Must Scream"
|Harlan Ellison
|The result of an American supercomputer made for war becoming sentient and going rogue, driving humanity to extinction and leaving only five humans alive to be tortured for eternity by the now-omnipotent supercomputer, christening itself AM (both after its original designation of Allied Mastercomputer and the quote "Cogito, ergo sum"). This was later turned into a point-and-click computer game, where AM was voiced by Harlan Ellison himself.

|- style="vertical-align:top;"
|Novel series
|1967–2005
|Technology
|The Berserker series
|Fred Saberhagen
|

|- style="vertical-align:top;"
|Novel
|1968
|Technology
|Rite of Passage
|Alexei Panshin
|Earth, after building a dozen or so Ships and seeding a number of colony planets, is destroyed. The Ships are technologically advanced, but the colony planets have all to some extent regressed technologically. The Ships' populations are managed on strictly eugenic lines: as part of this, they deliberately strand their young on colony planets for a month in the Trial, both to weed out bad genes and as a rite of passage. Nebula Award winner, Hugo Award nominee.

|- style="vertical-align:top;"
|Film
|1968
|War
|Planet of the Apes
|
|Adapted from the novel La planète des singes by Pierre Boulle

|- style="vertical-align:top;"
|Novel
|1968
|War
|Do Androids Dream of Electric Sheep?
|Philip K. Dick
|Basis for the film Blade Runner

|- style="vertical-align:top;"
|Novel
|1968
|Technology
|The God Machine
|Martin Caidin
|

|- style="vertical-align:top;"
|Comic
|1968–
|War
|Cobalt 60
|Vaughn Bodé
|First published in 1968, the series was revived from 1984-1985 and in 1993.

|- style="vertical-align:top;"
|Novel
|1968
|Social Collapse
|Stand on Zanzibar
|John Brunner
|Set in a future of extreme over-population. Winner of the Hugo Award, the British Science Fiction award, and the French Prix Apollo.

|- style="vertical-align:top;"
|Novel
| data-sort-value="1968" | 1968, 1970
|Supernatural
|Black Easter
|James Blish
|A black magician brings about the end of the world by releasing all of the demons from Hell. Followed by a sequel called The Day After Judgment (1970).

|- style="vertical-align:top;"
|Film
|1969
|War
|The Bed Sitting Room
|
|Absurdist comedy film set in a post-war London destroyed by a nuclear bomb in World War III. Originally based on a play by Spike Milligan and John Antrobus.

|- style="vertical-align:top;"
|Television
|1969
|War
|Salve Regina
|
|Four people seek refuge in the basement of a department store following a nuclear explosion

|- style="vertical-align:top;"
|Novel
|1969
|War
|Damnation Alley
|Roger Zelazny
|Made into a movie and a Hawkwind song in 1977

|- style="vertical-align:top;"
|Novel
|1969
|War
|Heroes and Villains
|Angela Carter
|

|- style="vertical-align:top;"
|Film
|1969
|Disease
|The Seed of Man ITA: Il Seme dell'uomo
|Marco Ferreri
|

|- style="vertical-align:top;"
|Novel
|1969
|Eco
|The Ice Schooner
|Michael Moorcock
|Set in a new ice age on Earth

|- style="vertical-align:top;"
|Story
|1969
|War
|"A Boy and His Dog"
|Harlan Ellison
|

|- style="vertical-align:top;"
|Film
|1970
|War
|Beneath the Planet of the Apes
|
|The second film in the Planet of the Apes feature film series.

|- style="vertical-align:top;"
|Novel
|1970
|War
|The Incredible Tide
|Alexander Key
|

|- style="vertical-align:top;"
|Novel
|1970
|War
|The Last War
|Kir Bulychev
|In the Russian language

|- style="vertical-align:top;"
|Novel
|1970
|War
|The Year Of The Quiet Sun
|Wilson Tucker
|

|- style="vertical-align:top;"
|Film
|1970
|Eco
|No Blade of Grass
|
|Based on the novel The Death of Grass

|- style="vertical-align:top;"
|Novel
|1970
|Future collapse
|Ringworld
|Larry Niven
|An expedition from earth to find a futuristic planet, a ring surrounding a star, results in the members finding that a meteor puncture in the ring's floor and power failure caused the cities to break apart and civilization to collapse

|- style="vertical-align:top;"
|Novel
|1970
|Supernatural, war, eco, human decline
|The Late, Great Planet Earth
|Carole C. Carlson, Hal Lindsey 
|Bestselling blockbuster Bible prophecy-based "mockumentary" novel, adapted into a 1979 feature-length theatrical motion picture narrated by Orson Welles

|- style="vertical-align:top;"
|Television
|1970
|Eco
|"Inferno"
|
|A Doctor Who serial in which attempts to tap Earth's core for power leads to a volcanic apocalypse.

|- style="vertical-align:top;"
|Film
|1971
|War
|Glen and Randa
|
|

|- style="vertical-align:top;"
|Film
|1971
|War
|The Omega Man
|
|An immune survivor of a biological/nuclear war battles plague-altered quasi-vampires bent on erasing all vestiges of science and technology. The second film version of Richard Matheson's 1954 novel I Am Legend

|- style="vertical-align:top;"
|Novel
|1971
|War
|Love in the Ruins
|Walker Percy
|

|- style="vertical-align:top;"
|Novel
|1971
|War
|The Overman Culture
|Edmund Cooper
|

|- style="vertical-align:top;"
|Television
|1971
|Eco
|Timeslip
|
|1971 TV series Timeslip: The Year of the Burn-Up – terraforming causes global warming

|- style="vertical-align:top;"
|Novel
|1971
|Eco
|Mutant 59: The Plastic Eater
|Gerry Davis, Kit Pedler
|A microbe designed to eat waste plastic gets loose

|- style="vertical-align:top;"
|Novel series
|1971
|Technology
|The Moderan series
|David R. Bunch
|

|- style="vertical-align:top;"
|Novel
|1971
|Sun
|Inconstant Moon
|Larry Niven
|

|- style="vertical-align:top;"
|Radio
|1972
|Aliens, disease, zombies
|The Peoria Plague
|
|Originally recorded and aired by station WUHN (now WSWT), in Peoria, Illinois

|- style="vertical-align:top;"
|Novel
|1972
|War
|Malevil
|Robert Merle
|

|- style="vertical-align:top;"
|Novel
|1972
|War
|There Will Be Time
|Poul Anderson
|

|- style="vertical-align:top;"
|Film
|1972
|Eco
|Silent Running
|
|Directorial debut for Douglas Trumbull. An ecologically minded astronaut struggles to save the last bio-dome preserving what is left of Earth's plant life. Adventures with uncooperative droids and the rings of Saturn ensue.

|- style="vertical-align:top;"
|Novel
|1972
|Eco
|The Sheep Look Up
|John Brunner
|The United States is overwhelmed by environmental irresponsibility and authoritarianism

|- style="vertical-align:top;"
|Novel
|1972
|Eco
|The End of the Dream
|Philip Wylie
|

|- style="vertical-align:top;"
|Film
|1972
|Supernatural
|A Thief in the Night
|
|The evangelical Christian film series, sometimes referred to as the Mark IV films.

|- style="vertical-align:top;"
|Film
|1972
|War
|Doomsday Machine
|
|In 1975, a crew of space travelers tries to colonize Venus after Earth is destroyed by a "doomsday device". Originally filmed in 1967, but (due to money problems) not finished and/or released until five years later. Directed by Herbert J. Leder, Lee Sholem, and producer Harry Hope.

|- style="vertical-align:top;"
|Comic
|1972–
|War
|Kamandi, the Last Boy on Earth
|Jack Kirby
|

|- style="vertical-align:top;"
|Film
|1973
|War
|Battle for the Planet of the Apes
|
|The fifth movie in the Planet of the Apes feature film series.

|- style="vertical-align:top;"
|Film
|1973
|War
|Genesis II
|Gene Roddenberry
|Later remade as the unsuccessful TV pilot Planet Earth

|- style="vertical-align:top;"
|Film
|1973
|War
|Refuge of FearSPA: El refugio del miedo
|
|

|- style="vertical-align:top;"
|Film
|1973
|Eco
|Idaho Transfer
|
|Directed by Peter Fonda. A research team discover a way to travel into the future, and in doing so discover that a worldwide ecological catastrophe is imminent. They send a group of earnest teenagers forward in time to repopulate the Earth after the disaster – but it does not end well.

|- style="vertical-align:top;"
|Novel
| data-sort-value="1973" | 1973, 1976
|Eco
|Children of Morrow and Treasures of Morrow
|H. M. Hoover
|Set in California several centuries after pollution has all but wiped out the human race; published in 1973 and 1976, respectively

|- style="vertical-align:top;"
|Story
|1973
|Eco
|Flight of the Horse
|Larry Niven
|Collection of short stories

|- style="vertical-align:top;"
|Comic
|1973
|Eco
|Violence Jack
|Go Nagai 
|A manga series that tells the tale of a Japan devastated by a massive earthquake and mass volcanic eruption and isolated from the rest of the world, with the remnants of humanity divided between the strong and the weak. A sequel to Nagai's Devilman manga series.

|- style="vertical-align:top;"
|Story
|1973
|Technology
|"Trucks"
|Stephen King
|An unknown phenomenon makes Earth's machines turn against humanity. It was later made into the movie Maximum Overdrive, which added an alien invasion subplot.

|- style="vertical-align:top;"
|Novel
|1973
|Human decline
|The Camp of the Saints
|Jean Raspail
|

|- style="vertical-align:top;"
|Television
|1973
|Unspecified
|The Starlost
|Harlan Ellison
|A Canadian-produced science fiction television series broadcast on CTV in Canada and on NBC in the United States.

|- style="vertical-align:top;"
|Television
|1973–1974
|Technology
|Casshan
|
|

|- style="vertical-align:top;"
|Film
|1974
|War
|The Third CryFr. Le Troisième Cri
|
|Swiss film.

|- style="vertical-align:top;"
|Novel
|1974
|Future collapse
|The Mote in God's Eye
|Larry Niven, Jerry Pournelle
|Mankind's growing interstellar empire discovers an old and sophisticated alien society restricted for millions of years to a single planet. Their hopes for a peaceful coexistence are shattered when they discover how the aliens control their population.

|- style="vertical-align:top;"
|Television
|1974
|War
|Planet Earth
|
|Unsuccessful TV pilot remake of Genesis II

|- style="vertical-align:top;"
|Television
|1974
|War
|Planet of the Apes
|
|TV series

|- style="vertical-align:top;"
|Film
|1974
|Disease
|Where Have All The People Gone?
|
|Made for TV movie. A mutated virus created by a solar flare destroys virtually all of the human population. One family has survived, and endeavors to travel across America to their family home.

|- style="vertical-align:top;"
|Film
|1974
|Eco
|Prophecies of Nostradamus
|
|

|- style="vertical-align:top;"
|Film
|1974
|Human decline
|Zardoz
|John Boorman
|

|- style="vertical-align:top;"
|Novel
|1974
|Disease
|The Last Canadian
|William C. Heine
|The planet is decimated by a virus, as told through the eyes of one survivor

|- style="vertical-align:top;"
|Film
|1974
|Zombies
|Dawn of the Dead
|
|Survivors barricade themselves in a suburban mall amid a zombie apocalypse

|- style="vertical-align:top;"
|Novel
|1974, 1979, 1984, 1993
|Monsters
|The Rats series - The Rats (1974), Lair (1979), Domain (1984) and The City (1993; a graphic novel)
|James Herbert
| – Domain (1984) and The City (1993), the last two books of the series, show how, after a nuclear war, humanity is overthrown by mutated giant black rats.

|- style="vertical-align:top;"
|Film
|1975
|War
|A Boy and His Dog
|
|A young man (Don Johnson) and his dog (Tiger, the dog actor) struggle for survival and encounter strife in a harsh, post-apocalyptic wasteland where food, water, and women are scarce. Based on the writings of Harlan Ellison.

|- style="vertical-align:top;"
|Film
|1975
|War
|Black Moon
|
|Surreal French production.

|- style="vertical-align:top;"
|Film
|1975
|War
|La città dell'ultima paura
|
|

|- style="vertical-align:top;"
|Film
|1975
|War
|The Noah
|Daniel Bourla
|An American soldier becomes the sole survivor of a nuclear war

|- style="vertical-align:top;"
|Television
|1975
|War
|"Day of the Daleks"
|
|A Doctor Who serial that also features alien invasion. Guerrillas from the future explain that they are attempting to kill someone because he caused an explosion at a peace conference, starting a series of wars that left humanity vulnerable to conquest by the Daleks.

|- style="vertical-align:top;"
|Television
|1975
|War
|Return to the Planet of the Apes
|
|Animated TV series

|- style="vertical-align:top;"
|Television
|1975
|War
|Strange New World
|
|Another unsuccessful TV pilot remake of Genesis II and Planet Earth

|- style="vertical-align:top;"
|Television
|1975–1977
|Eco (nuclear waste explosion on the Moon, followed by earthquakes, tsunamis, floods, etc. on Earth, caused by the loss of the Moon)
|Space: 1999
|Gerry Anderson, Sylvia Anderson
|

|- style="vertical-align:top;"
|Novel
|1975
|War
|Caravan
|Stephen Goldin
|

|- style="vertical-align:top;"
|Novel series
|1975
|War
|The Horseclans series
|Robert Adams
|Seventeen-book series. First book The Coming of the Horseclans (1975)

|- style="vertical-align:top;"
|Novel
|1975
|War
|Z for Zachariah
|Robert C. O'Brien
|

|- style="vertical-align:top;"
|Film
|1975
|Disease
|The Ultimate Warrior
|
|

|- style="vertical-align:top;"
|Novel
|1975
|Disease
|The Girl Who Owned a City
|O.T. Nelson
|

|- style="vertical-align:top;"
|Film
|1975
|Eco
|Logan's Run
|
|Society is chased into domes by an ecological disaster, and holds a ceremonial death ritual for all citizens who reach the age of 30 to control the population. A man who formerly helped control the population flees the domed city to avoid his own ceremony.

|- style="vertical-align:top;"
|Novel
|1975
|Unspecified
|Dhalgren
|Samuel R. Delany
|

|- style="vertical-align:top;"
|Television
|1975–1977
|Disease
|Survivors
|
|BBC series about the daily struggles of British survivors of a plague which kills most of the world population

|- style="vertical-align:top;"
|Film
|1976
|War
|The People Who Own the DarkSp. Último deseo
|Amando de Ossorio
|

|- style="vertical-align:top;"
|Novel
|1976
|War
|Deus Irae
|Philip K. Dick, Roger Zelazny
|Collaboration.

|- style="vertical-align:top;"
|Novel
|1976
|Eco
|The HAB Theory
|Allan W. Eckert
|The stability of Earth comes into question

|- style="vertical-align:top;"
|Novel
|1976
|Eco
|The Winter of the World
|Poul Anderson
|Civilization and a new species has emerged from a deadly ice age that has destroyed all previous life

|- style="vertical-align:top;"
|Novel
|1976
|Sun
|A World Out of Time
|Larry Niven
|

|- style="vertical-align:top;"
|Television series
|1976–1979
|Eco
|Ark II
|
|Pollution devastates humanity

|- style="vertical-align:top;"
|Novel
|1977
|Unspecified
|Eumeswil
|Ernst Jünger
|The story is set in an undatable post-apocalyptic world, somewhere in present-day Morocco

|- style="vertical-align:top;"
|Film
|1977
|War
|Damnation Alley
|
|A surviving American ICBM crew sets out across the U.S. in an armored vehicle in search of survivors in Albany, New York – based on the novel by Roger Zelazny

|- style="vertical-align:top;"
|Film
|1977
|War
|Wizards
|Ralph Bakshi
|A good wizard and his evil brother battle some two millennia after Armageddon

|- style="vertical-align:top;"
|Novel
|1977
|Impact Event
|Lucifer's Hammer
|Larry Niven, Jerry Pournelle
|A comet impact

|- style="vertical-align:top;"
|Novel series
|1977–
|War
|The Shannara series
|Terry Brooks
|

|- style="vertical-align:top;"
|Film
|1977
|Eco, supernatural
|Holocaust 2000
|
|Directed by Alberto De Martino.

|- style="vertical-align:top;"
|Comic
|1977
|War
|Judge Dredd
|Carlos Ezquerra, Pat Mills, John Wagner
|

|- style="vertical-align:top;"
|Novel
|1977
|Disease
|Empty World
|John Christopher
|A virus wipes out the weak and the old, until the planet is populated by young teenagers only

|- style="vertical-align:top;"
|Story
|1977
|Disease
|"Night Surf"
|Stephen King
|Collected in the book Night Shift.

|- style="vertical-align:top;"
|Story
|1977
|Eco
|"The Screwfly Solution"
|
|Short story; tells the tale of a virus which turns males into female-hating psychopaths when sexually aroused

|- style="vertical-align:top;"
|Television
|1977
|Eco
|Logan's Run (TV series)
|
|Logan's Run is an American science fiction television series, a spin-off from the 1976 film of the same name.

|- style="vertical-align:top;"
|Comic
|1977–1996
|Technology
|Galaxy Express 999
|
|Manga series

|- style="vertical-align:top;"
|Television
|1978–1980, 2003, 2004-2009
|Aliens, Technology
|Battlestar Galactica
|
|A race of (alien-built (1978–80)/man-made (2003–09)) machine beings launch a devastating final assault upon the humans' original homeworlds, and chase a ragtag fleet of survivors, who are in search of a mythical planet called Earth.

|- style="vertical-align:top;"
|Film
|1978
|War
|Deathsport
|
|

|- style="vertical-align:top;"
|Television
|1978
|War
|Future Boy Conan
|Hayao Miyazaki
|An anime series where supermagnetic WMDs devastate Earth and cause virtually all land to be submerged underwater.

|- style="vertical-align:top;"
|Novel
|1978
|Disease
|The Stand
|
|Stephen King

|- style="vertical-align:top;"
|Film
|1978
|Aliens
|Invasion of the Body Snatchers
|
|Another film based on the novel The Body Snatchers by Jack Finney

|- style="vertical-align:top;"
|Novel
|1978
|Unspecified
|False Dawn
|Chelsea Quinn Yarbro
|Two humans search for a way to survive in a toxic wasteland. Republished in 2001.

|- style="vertical-align:top;"
|Game
|1978–2010
|War
|Gamma World
|
|Game from TSR, Inc., the makers of Dungeons & Dragons

|- style="vertical-align:top;"
|Film
|1979
|War
|Ravagers
|
|

|- style="vertical-align:top;"
|Film
|1979
|Disease
|Plague
|
|Also known as Induced Syndrome (U.K.), M-3: The Gemini Strain (U.S.), or Mutation.

|- style="vertical-align:top;"
|Television
|1979
|War
|Buck Rogers In The 25th Century
|
|Mostly futuristic in appearance, but outside of the gleaming Utopian city lies apocalyptic ruins swarming with mutants.

|- style="vertical-align:top;"
|Novel
|1979
|War
|Down to a Sunless Sea
|David Graham
|

|- style="vertical-align:top;"
|Novel series
|1979–1982
|Future collapse
|Last Legionary
|Douglas Hill
|A lone soldier fights to bring down the organization which unleashed a deadly radiation against his planet, killing all his people and rendering the planet uninhabitable

|- style="vertical-align:top;"
|Film
|1979
|Impact Event
|Meteor
|
|

|- style="vertical-align:top;"
|Song
|1979
|War
|"Your Attention Please"
|Scars
|Post-punk song adaptation of the 1961 Porter poem of the same name

|- style="vertical-align:top;"
|Film
|1979
|Eco
|Quintet
|
|

|- style="vertical-align:top;"
|Film
|1979
|Human decline
|Mad Max
|
|Australian movie; depicts a declining civilization through the eyes of the titular character who seeks revenge. Starring Mel Gibson.

|- style="vertical-align:top;"
|Novel
|1979
|Unspecified
|Engine Summer
|John Crowley
|Civilization transformed several millennia past an unspecified collapse of civilization

|- style="vertical-align:top;"
|Novel
|1979–1992
|Aliens
|The Hitchhiker's Guide to the Galaxy
|Douglas Adams
|

|- style="vertical-align:top;"
|Game book series
|1979–1998
|Technology
|Choose Your Own Adventure
|Edward Packard
|

|- style="vertical-align:top;"
|Novel
|1980
|War
|The Fifth Horseman
|Larry Collins, Dominique Lapierre
|

|- style="vertical-align:top;"
|Novel
|1980
|War
|Riddley Walker
|Russell Hoban
|

|- style="vertical-align:top;"
|Novel
|1980
|War
|This Time of Darkness
|H.M. Hoover
|

|- style="vertical-align:top;"
|Song
|1980
|Technology
|"The Eighth Day"
|Hazel O'Connor
|Hit single

|- style="vertical-align:top;"
|Film
|1980
|Disease
|Fukkatsu no hi
|
|Japanese film also known as Virus, directed by Kinji Fukasaku. Based on the 1964 book.

|- style="vertical-align:top;"
|Novel
|1980
|Aliens
|Battlefield Earth
|L. Ron Hubbard
|

|- style="vertical-align:top;"
|Game
|1980
|War
|NukeWar
|
|Published by gaming company Avalon Hill. A turn-based strategy game for many early home computing platforms, such as the Apple II, the Commodore 64, and the Atari 400/800 model home computers.

|- style="vertical-align:top;"
|Novella
|1980
|Aliens
|"The Mist"
|Stephen King
|

|- style="vertical-align:top;"
|Novel
|1980
|Aliens
|The Visitors
|Clifford D. Simak
|

|- style="vertical-align:top;"
|Game
|1980
|War+
|Missile Command
|Dave Theurer
|Arcade video game designed by Theurer and developed by Atari, Inc. Later ported to many different home computing and gaming platforms for many years afterward. Considered one of the most notable classic video games of all time.

|- style="vertical-align:top;"
|Novel series
|1980–1983
|Human decline
|The Book of the New Sun
|Gene Wolfe
|

|- style="vertical-align:top;"
|Novel
|1980
|Sun
|The Shadow of the Torturer
|Gene Wolfe
|Followed by The Claw of the Conciliator (1981), The Sword of the Lictor (1981), The Citadel of the Autarch (1982), and The Urth of the New Sun (1987).

|- style="vertical-align:top;"
|Television
|1980–1982
|Impact Event
|Thundarr the Barbarian
|
|Events 2,000 years after the disaster of 1994

|- style="vertical-align:top;"
|Game
|1980–1983
|War
|The Morrow Project
|
|Game from Timeline Ltd.

|- style="vertical-align:top;"
|Film
|1981
|War
|Mad Max 2
|
|The second installment in the Mad Max series, known as The Road Warrior in the U.S. This movie follows the titular character as he interacts with a community based around a small oil refinery and a group of marauding bandits. Starring Mel Gibson.

|- style="vertical-align:top;"
|Film
|1981
|War
|Malevil
|
|Film version directed by Christian de Chalonge. Starring Michel Serrault, Jacques Dutronc and Jean-Louis Trintignant

|- style="vertical-align:top;"
|Novel series
|1981
|War
|The Survivalist series
|Jerry Ahern
|First book 1981, Total War

|- style="vertical-align:top;"
|Game
|1981
|War
|Aftermath!
|
|Game from Fantasy Games Unlimited

|- style="vertical-align:top;"
|Novel series
|1981
|War
|The Pelbar Cycle
|Paul O. Williams
|Seven-book series. First book The Breaking of Northwall (1981); a thousand years after a series of nuclear exchanges. Re-published in 2005.

|- style="vertical-align:top;"
|Novel
|1981
|Eco
|The Quiet Earth
|Craig Harrison
|Adapted into the 1985 movie of the same name.

|- style="vertical-align:top;"
|Television
|1981
|Impact Event, Monsters, Disease
|The Day of the Triffids
|
|1981 TV adaptation of The Day of the Triffids by John Wyndham

|- style="vertical-align:top;"
|Novel
|1981
|Technology
|Robot Revolt
|Nicholas Fisk
|

|- style="vertical-align:top;"
|Comic
|1981
|Technology
|Uncanny X-Men
|John Byrne, Chris Claremont
|"Days of Future Past" story arc

|- style="vertical-align:top;"
|Film
|1982
|War
|Battletruck
|
|Set in New Zealand, survivors of nuclear war (known as the Oil Wars) attempt to rebuild society while fending off the ambitions of a militaristic despot who has based himself in a mobile armored vehicle.

|- style="vertical-align:top;"
|Film
|1982
|War
|2020 Texas Gladiators
|
|Post-apocalyptic Italian film

|- style="vertical-align:top;"
|Film
|1982
|War
|The Aftermath
|
|Returning astronauts encounter bikers and mutants in a post-nuclear setting. Released as Zombie Aftermath in the U.K.

|- style="vertical-align:top;"
|Novel
|1982
|Human decline
|Friday
|Robert A. Heinlein
|Human society on a future Earth is slipping into a gradual, but inevitable, collapse

|- style="vertical-align:top;"
|Novel
|1982–
|Human decline
|The Dark Tower series
|Stephen King
|First book published in 1982

|- style="vertical-align:top;"
|Comic
|1982–1990
|War
|Akira
|Katsuhiro Otomo
|Cyberpunk manga series published by Dark Horse Comics – about a group of young bikers in a post-apocalyptic Tokyo who clash with the government and psychics with incredible power. Adapted into a 1988 animated movie

|- style="vertical-align:top;"
|Film
|1982
|War
|Human Highway
|
|

|- style="vertical-align:top;"
|Television
|1982
|War
|World War III
|
|Originally broadcast on the NBC television network. The film's original director, Boris Sagal, died in a freak mishap during filming, and was replaced by his successor, David Greene. The teleplay was written by Robert L. Joseph.

|- style="vertical-align:top;"
|Film
|1982
|War
|She
|
|A low-budget B-movie and an extremely loose adaptation of the novel She by H. Rider Haggard, starring Sandahl Bergman as a post-civilization warrior.

|- style="vertical-align:top;"
|Film
|1982
|War
|Warriors of the Wasteland
|
|After a nuclear war, humanity is reduced to starving tribes with roving gangs seeking to take what they can by force.

|- style="vertical-align:top;"
|Television
|1982
|War
|Whoops Apocalypse
|
|

|- style="vertical-align:top;"
|Novel
|1982
|Disease
|The White Plague
|Frank Herbert
|

|- style="vertical-align:top;"
|Game
|1982
|Technology
|Robotron: 2084
|
|Created by Williams

|- style="vertical-align:top;"
|Television
|1982–1983
|Aliens
|The Super Dimension Fortress Macross
|
|The anime series and its sequels (rewritten and combined with The Super Dimension Cavalry Southern Cross and Genesis Climber Mospeada to create Robotech', which dealt similarly with post-apocalyptic themes).

|- style="vertical-align:top;"
|Film
|1983
|War
|2019, After the Fall of New York
|
|An Italian film set in 2019 featuring a mercenary out to rescue the last fertile woman on Earth.

|- style="vertical-align:top;"
|Film
|1983
|War
|Endgame
|
|

|- style="vertical-align:top;"
|Film
|1983
|War
|Exterminators of the Year 3000
|
|

|- style="vertical-align:top;"
|Film
|1983
|War
|Le Dernier Combat
|
|Luc Besson

|- style="vertical-align:top;"
|Film
|1983
|War
|Stryker
|
|

|- style="vertical-align:top;"
|Film
|1983
|War
|Testament
|
|

|- style="vertical-align:top;"
|Film
|1983
|War
|Warrior of the Lost World
|
|A wanderer on a super-sonic motorcycle becomes the savior of a society of misfits.

|- style="vertical-align:top;"
|Film
|1983
|War
|Yor, the Hunter from the Future
|
|

|- style="vertical-align:top;"
|Television
|1983
|War
|The Day After
|
|The effects of nuclear war on a Kansas town

|- style="vertical-align:top;"
|Novel
|1983
|War
|The Amtrak Wars
|Patrick Tilley
|Series, set at the end of the 3rd millennium

|- style="vertical-align:top;"
|Novel series
|1983
|War
|The Ashes series
|William W. Johnstone
|First book 1983, Out of the Ashes

|- style="vertical-align:top;"
|Comic
|1983–1988
|War
|Fist of the North Star
|Buronson, Tetsuo Hara
|Influential shonen manga series featuring a warrior trained in a powerful martial arts style rights wrongs and battles evil warlords in a post-apocalyptic world. Inspired the landmark anime series, a live-action film, and many games.

|- style="vertical-align:top;"
|Novel
|1983
|War
|Hiero's Journey
|Sterling E. Lanier
|Plus a sequel calledThe Unforsaken Hiero (1985); a "metis" priest/killman quests across post-apocalyptic northeastern North America, 7,000 years in the future

|- style="vertical-align:top;"
|Novel
|1983
|War
|The Last Children of Schewenborn
|Gudrun Pausewang
|

|- style="vertical-align:top;"
|Novel
|1983
|War
|Pulling Through
|Dean Ing
|

|- style="vertical-align:top;"
|Novel
|1983
|War
|Trinity's Child
|William Prochnau
|

|- style="vertical-align:top;"
|Novel series
|1983
|War
|Vampire Hunter D
|Hideyuki Kikuchi
|First book 1983, novels (and later anime movies), set 10,000 years after a nuclear war occurs in 1999

|- style="vertical-align:top;"
|Television
|1983–1984
|Aliens
|Genesis Climber Mospeada
|
|Anime series (see also Robotech)

|- style="vertical-align:top;"
|Television series
|1983–1985
|Aliens
|V
|
|

|- style="vertical-align:top;"
|Film
|1984
|War
|Dark Enemy
|
|

|- style="vertical-align:top;"
|Comic
|1984–1995
|Technology
|Dragon Ball
|
|In the Cell saga of Dragon Ball Z, a time traveler arrives from a post-apocalyptic future where two powerful killer androids have destroyed much of the world, and attempts to stop the same thing from happening in the main timeline.

|- style="vertical-align:top;"
|Story
|1984
|War
|"Extinction is Forever"
|Louise Lawrence
|A scientist uses a time machine to travel to the future and film the results of a nuclear war in a bid to prevent it from happening. However, his actions could have serious repercussions for the mutated descendants of the human race.

|- style="vertical-align:top;"
|Film
|1984
|War
|Radioactive Dreams
|
|After an atomic war, Phillip Hammer and Marlowe Chandler have spent 15 years on their own in a bunker, then they find the keys to the last MX missile.

|- style="vertical-align:top;"
|Film
|1984
|War
|Sexmission
|
|A Polish comedy. All men, except two who were hibernating, die after a war with the use of an M-bomb that kills only males.

|- style="vertical-align:top;"
|Television
|1984
|War
|Threads
|
|BBC television docudrama

|- style="vertical-align:top;"
|Television
|1984
|War
|Z for Zachariah
|
|BBC made-for-TV film adaptation of the 1975 novel of the same name

|- style="vertical-align:top;"
|Novel
|1984
|War
|The Beast of Heaven
|Victor Kelleher
|A group of wanderers is scavenging a deserted landscape while two AI wardens are rowing about the last bomb.

|- style="vertical-align:top;"
|Novel
|1984
|War
|Brother in the Land
|Robert Swindells
|

|- style="vertical-align:top;"
|Novel
|1984
|War
|Doomsday Plus Twelve
|James D. Forman
|

|- style="vertical-align:top;"
|Novel
|1984
|War
|Emergence
|David R. Palmer
|

|- style="vertical-align:top;"
|Novel series
|1984
|War
|The Traveler series
|D. B. Drumm
|First book First, You Fight (1984)

|- style="vertical-align:top;"
|Novel
|1984
|War
|Warday
|James Kunetka, Whitley Strieber
|

|- style="vertical-align:top;"
|Novel
|1984
|Disease
|Clay's Ark
|Octavia Butler
|

|- style="vertical-align:top;"
|Film
|1984
|Impact Event
|Night of the Comet
|
|When a comet passes too close to earth, two girls are left amid mutants.

|- style="vertical-align:top;"
|Television
|1984
|War
|Countdown to Looking Glass
|
|Canadian-produced TV movie, directed by producer Fred Barzyk, and originally premiering in the United States, on the HBO pay-cable TV network

|- style="vertical-align:top;"
|Film
|1984
|Eco
|Nausicaä of the Valley of the Wind
|Hayao Miyazaki
|Based on the manga of the same name

|- style="vertical-align:top;"
|Novel
|1984
|Eco
|In the Drift
|Michael Swanwick
|Also an alternate history story – the 1979 Three Mile Island reactor incident resulted in a very large release of radioactivity, devastating the northeastern U.S.

|- style="vertical-align:top;"
|Television
|1984–1985
|Aliens
|The Tripods
|
|An adaptation of the first two books in the trilogy by John Christopher

|- style="vertical-align:top;"
|Television
|1984–1987
|War
|Fist of the North Star
|
|Landmark post-apocalyptic anime series based on the manga of the same name.

|- style="vertical-align:top;"
|Game
|1984–1993
|War
|Twilight: 2000
|
|Game from Game Designer's Workshop – set in a world where a Sino-Russian war degenerates into a limited nuclear conflict that eventually drags in Europe and America

|- style="vertical-align:top;"
|Film
|1984–2009
|Technology
|The Terminator franchise
|
|Series of films dealing with a future devastated by a war between humans and machines, the attempt of the machines to kill the hero of the human resistance in the past, and the attempt of the hero and others to prevent this future from ever coming to pass

|- style="vertical-align:top;"
|Film
|1985
|Zombies
|Day of the Dead
|
| A handful of soldiers and scientists holed up in an underground bunker try to survive and understand the zombies outside the gates. Final chapter of Romero's trilogy.

|- style="vertical-align:top;"
|Film
|1985
|War
|Def-Con 4
|
|

|- style="vertical-align:top;"
|Film
|1985
|War
|Mad Max Beyond Thunderdome
|
|The third installment in the Mad Max series. This film follows the titular character as he interacts with the post-apocalyptic community of Bartertown. Starring Mel Gibson.

|- style="vertical-align:top;"
|Film
|1985
|War
|Warriors of the Apocalypse
|
|After civilization is wiped out by nuclear war, an adventurer leads a group of wanderers on a search for the fabled Mountain of Life.

|- style="vertical-align:top;"
|Novel
|1985
|War
|Children of the Dust
|Louise Lawrence
|

|- style="vertical-align:top;"
|Novel
|1985
|War
|Fiskadoro
|Denis Johnson
|

|- style="vertical-align:top;"
|Novel
|1985
|War
|Freeway Fighter
|Ian Livingstone
|Part of the "Fighting Fantasy" Gamebook series (like the Choose Your Own Adventure series)

|- style="vertical-align:top;"
|Novel
|1985
|Human decline
|Galápagos
|Kurt Vonnegut
|After an ambiguous eradication of the human species, several people on a cruise to the Galápagos Islands get stranded there. Much to the dismay of the only male left, the women of the island continue the human species for thousands of years, where they evolve into seal-like creatures.

|- style="vertical-align:top;"
|Comic
|1985–1989
|War
|Appleseed
|Masamune Shirow
|Japanese manga (and subsequent anime adaptations)

|- style="vertical-align:top;"
|Novel
|1985
|War
|The Postman
|David Brin
|A novel set in Oregon after the apocalypse. Serves as a basis for the 1997 movie of the same name.

|- style="vertical-align:top;"
|Novel
|1985
|War
|The Steel, the Mist and the Blazing Sun
|Christopher Anvil
|

|- style="vertical-align:top;"
|Novel
|1985
|War
|This Is the Way the World Ends
|James Morrow
|

|- style="vertical-align:top;"
|Film
|1985
|Disease
|City Limits
|
|

|- style="vertical-align:top;"
|Novel
|1985
|Disease
|Blood Music
|Greg Bear
|

|- style="vertical-align:top;"
|Novel
|1985
|Disease
|The Fourth Horseman
|Alan E. Nourse
|Follows the progression of a new outbreak of the Black Death and the struggle to survive as society collapses

|- style="vertical-align:top;"
|Novel
|1985
|Aliens
|Footfall
|Larry Niven, Jerry Pournelle
|Baby elephant-like invaders hurl asteroids at Earth; the humans revolt

|- style="vertical-align:top;"
|Novel
|1985
|Eco
|The Handmaid's Tale
|Margaret Atwood
|Dystopia is fueled by rampant infertility caused by pollution

|- style="vertical-align:top;"
|Film
|1985
|Technology
|Starchaser: The Legend of Orin
|
|

|- style="vertical-align:top;"
|Novel
|1985
|Technology
|The Adolescence of P-1
|Thomas J. Ryan
|

|- style="vertical-align:top;"
|Game
|1985
|Technology
|The Mechanoid Invasion
|
|Gamebook and its source books, supplements and sequels; was the first role-playing game from Palladium Books, conceived and written by Kevin Siembieda

|- style="vertical-align:top;"
|Film
|1985
|Sun
|The Quiet Earth
|
|Based on the 1981 novel The Quiet Earth by Craig Harrison

|- style="vertical-align:top;"
|Film
|1986
|War
|America 3000
|
|In Colorado, 900 years after a nuclear war in the U.S., humanity is sent back to the Stone Age.

|- style="vertical-align:top;"
|Film
|1986
|War
|Fist of the North Star
|
|Animated Japanese film based on the manga of the same name.

|- style="vertical-align:top;"
|Film
|1986
|War
|Robot Holocaust
|
|

|- style="vertical-align:top;"
|Film
|1986
|War
|The Sacrifice
|
|

|- style="vertical-align:top;"
|Film
|1986
|War
|When the Wind Blows
|Jimmy Murakami
|Adapting the graphic novel by Raymond Briggs

|- style="vertical-align:top;"
|Film
|1986
|War
|Whoops Apocalypse
|
|

|- style="vertical-align:top;"
|Novel series
|1986–
|War
|The Deathlands series
|James Axler
|

|- style="vertical-align:top;"
|Novel series
|1986
|War
|The Endworld series
|David L. Robbins
|First book 1986

|- style="vertical-align:top;"
|Film
|1986
|Disease
|Dead Man's Letters
|Konstantin Lopushanskij
|

|- style="vertical-align:top;"
|Story
|1986
|Aliens
|Maximum Overdrive
|Stephen King
|Aliens remotely control machines (trucks, cars and even vending machines) to kill the human population before invading. Based on the Stephen King short story "Trucks".

|- style="vertical-align:top;"
|Novel
|1986
|Sun
|Songs of Distant Earth
|Arthur C. Clarke
|In which the last survivors of Earth arrive at a distant colony unexpectedly

|- style="vertical-align:top;"
|Comic
|1986–1993
|War
|Ex-Mutants
|
|Set in a post-nuclear world

|- style="vertical-align:top;"
|Film
|1986
|Eco
|Solarbabies
|
|Also known as Solarwarriors

|- style="vertical-align:top;"
|Novel
|1986
|Eco
|Nature's End
|James Kunetka, Whitley Strieber 
|

|- style="vertical-align:top;"
|Story
|1986
|Eco
|"The End of the Whole Mess"
|Stephen King
|A distillate of a Texas aquifer, originally harvested and distributed worldwide to reduce human propensity for violence, curses humanity with premature Alzheimer's disease and senility

|- style="vertical-align:top;"
|Manga
|1986–1989
|Aliens
|Outlanders
|Johji Manabe
|

|- style="vertical-align:top;"
|Game
|1986–2003
|Future collapse, aliens
|Might and Magic series original universe
|Jon van Caneghem
|The games are set in colonies of the Ancients, an advanced space-faring race, several thousand years after all contact with the Ancients was lost due to them being engaged in interstellar war with an alien race called the Kreegan. This event, called the Silence, caused the colonies to regress into a medieval state and consider Ancients and their technology as mythical in nature.

|- style="vertical-align:top;"
|Film
|1987
|War
|Cherry 2000
|
|

|- style="vertical-align:top;"
|Novel
|1987
|War
|The King Awakes
|Janice Elliott
|King Arthur awakens in post-nuclear Britain.

|- style="vertical-align:top;"
|Film
|1987
|War
|Creepozoids
|
|

|- style="vertical-align:top;"
|Film
|1987
|War
|Death Run
|
|

|- style="vertical-align:top;"
|Film
|1987
|War
|Hell Comes to Frogtown
|
|

|- style="vertical-align:top;"
|Film
|1987
|War
|Interzone
|
|

|- style="vertical-align:top;"
|Film
|1987
|War
|Steel Dawn
|
|

|- style="vertical-align:top;"
|Film
|1987
|War
|The Survivalist
|
|The Soviet Union blames the U.S. for a nuclear explosion, and in the ensuing chaos, the protagonist must defend his family. Based on the Jerry Ahern pulp novel series.

|- style="vertical-align:top;"
|Film
|1987
|War
|Survivor
|
|

|- style="vertical-align:top;"
|Film
|1987
|War
|Urban Warriors
|
|Three technicians working in an underground laboratory discover that a nuclear war has destroyed most of the aboveground world.

|- style="vertical-align:top;"
|Television
|1987
|War
|Knights of God
|
|

|- style="vertical-align:top;"
|Novel
|1987
|War
|Fire Brats
|Scott Siegel
|First book 1987, co-authored with Barbera Siegel, grades 8–10

|- style="vertical-align:top;"
|Novel series
|1987
|War
|Obernewtyn Chronicles
|Isobelle Carmody
|First book 1987

|- style="vertical-align:top;"
|Novel
|1987
|War
|Swan Song
|
|Robert R. McCammon

|- style="vertical-align:top;"
|Game
|1987
|War
|Crystalis
|
|Game from SNK

|- style="vertical-align:top;"
|Game
|1987–
|War (interstellar), Aliens (ancient civilizations), Disease (Mutations), Technology (Use of Artificial Intelligence), Supernatural (Daemons and Sorcery), Future collapse (Isolation of colonized planets), Social collapse (Return of medieval superstitions), Human decline (Negligence of fundamental human rights)
|Warhammer 40,000
|
|The Eldar, a technologically advanced race who dominated the galaxy until the 29th millennium and was superior to the nascent human race, fell into moral decadence, causing the disfigurement of reality to numerous star systems colonized by the people of Earth fueled by the negative emotions of countless sentiment species brought into instability and unending conflict merely for survival, while at the same time the majority of humanity's population had degraded to a pre-industrial society because of the loss of technology due to a massive confrontation with artificially intelligent machines over thousands of years, until an Empire forcefully united most humans under a fascist totalitarian theocratic regime that conducted an unending war for the genocide of every other advanced lifeform, including some affected by supernatural factors.

|- style="vertical-align:top;"
|Novel
|1987
|Aliens
|The Forge of God
|Greg Bear
|

|- style="vertical-align:top;"
|Novel
|1987
|Eco
|Wolf In Shadow
|David Gemmell
|The world is devastated by huge tsunamis. Most of the technology left in the world is on par with the mid- to late 1800s, but there are some newer weapons around.

|- style="vertical-align:top;"
|Novel
|1987–
|Unspecified
|Wraeththu
|Storm Constantine
|A series of novels set in a world where humanity is replaced as the planet's dominant species by a race of mystic hermaphrodites. War and plague ravage the human population, but no single cause is specified.

|- style="vertical-align:top;"
|Song
|1987
|Technology
|"Twilight of The Gods"
|Helloween
|

|- style="vertical-align:top;"
|Novel
|1987
|Unspecified
|In the Country of Last Things
|Paul Auster
|

|- style="vertical-align:top;"
|Television
|1987–1988
|Technology
|Captain Power and the Soldiers of the Future
|
|After a war against the machines in which the humans lost, a small group of resistance fighters must keep humanity alive against the evil forces of Lord Dread.

|- style="vertical-align:top;"
|Film
|1988
|War
|Akira
|
|Groundbreaking anime movie based on the manga of the same name

|- style="vertical-align:top;"
|Film
|1988
|War
|Miracle Mile
|
|

|- style="vertical-align:top;"
|Film
|1988
|War
|She-Wolves of the Wasteland
|
|

|- style="vertical-align:top;"
|Television
|1988–1999; 2009–
|Future collapse
|Red Dwarf
|
|British science-fiction sitcom; first ran between 1988 and 1999 and was restarted in 2009

|- style="vertical-align:top;"
|Film
|1988
|War
|World Gone Wild
|
|

|- style="vertical-align:top;"
|Novel series
|1988
|War
|Freeway Warrior
|Joe Dever
|First book 1988

|- style="vertical-align:top;"
|Novel
|1988
|War
|The Gate to Women's Country
|Sheri S. Tepper
|

|- style="vertical-align:top;"
|Novel
|1988
|War
|The Last Ship
|William Brinkley
|

|- style="vertical-align:top;"
|Novel
|1988
|War
|Time Capsule
|Mitch Berman
|

|- style="vertical-align:top;"
|Film
|1988
|Aliens
|They Live
|
|Part science fiction thriller and part black comedy

|- style="vertical-align:top;"
|Game
|1988
|Aliens
|Manhunter
|
|A computer game set in an alternate timeline where Earth's population is enslaved by an alien species known as the Orbs

|- style="vertical-align:top;"
|Game
|1988
|Technology
|Wasteland
|
|Post-apocalyptic RPG, main story features a rogue AI that not only caused a nuclear war between the United States and Soviet Union, but also is attempting to eradicate any humans that survived

|- style="vertical-align:top;"
|Novel
|1988
|Human decline
|At Winter's End
|Robert Silverberg
|

|- style="vertical-align:top;"
|Game
|1988
|Social Collapse
|Dark Future
|
|Miniature wargame by Games Workshop – a role-playing game franchise composed of the game and associated novels and short-story anthologies set within the Dark Future universe

|- style="vertical-align:top;"
|Novel
|1988
|Unspecified
|Tea from an Empty Cup
|Pat Cadigan
|A novel set in a cyberpunk world following a vaguely described natural cataclysm

|- style="vertical-align:top;"
|Television
|1988–1990
|Aliens
|War of the Worlds: The Second Invasion
|
|The second season of this television spin-off from the 1953 movie was set after a successful alien invasion.

|- style="vertical-align:top;"
|Film
|1989
|War
|The Blood of Heroes
|David Webb Peoples
|Australian film written and directed by Peoples

|- style="vertical-align:top;"
|Film
|1989
|Zombies
|The Dead Next Door
|
|Low-budget, Sam Raimi produced, zombie apocalypse film.

|- style="vertical-align:top;"
|Film
|1989
|War
|Cyborg
|
|

|- style="vertical-align:top;"
|Film
|1989
|War
|Empire of Ash II
|
|

|- style="vertical-align:top;"
|Film
|1989
|War
|Empire of Ash III
|
|

|- style="vertical-align:top;"
|Novella
|1989
|Zombies
|On the Far Side of the Cadillac Desert With Dead Folks
|Joe R. Lansdale
|

|- style="vertical-align:top;"
|Novella
|1989
|War
|Folk of the Fringe
|Orson Scott Card
|Novella "West", plus several short stories

|- style="vertical-align:top;"
|Game
|1989
|War
|Badlands
|
|A racing game by Atari Games set in the aftermath of nuclear war with races taking place in the wastelands left over from the war.

|- style="vertical-align:top;"
|Novel
|1989
|Disease
|Plague 99
|Jean Ure
|Sequels Come Lucky April and Watchers at the Shrine

|- style="vertical-align:top;"
|Film
|1989
|Eco
|Millennium
|
|

|- style="vertical-align:top;"
|Film
|1989
|Eco
|Slipstream
|
|

|- style="vertical-align:top;"
|Novel
|1989
|Eco
|Stark
|
|Ben Elton

|- style="vertical-align:top;"
|Film
|1989
|Technology
|Gunhed
|
|

|- style="vertical-align:top;"
|Film
|1989
|Technology
|Moontrap
|
|

|- style="vertical-align:top;"
|Novel
|1989
|Monsters
|Moonbane
|Al Sarrantonio
|About a worldwide uprising of werewolves

|- style="vertical-align:top;"
|Novel
|1989
|Supernatural
|The Dead
|Mark E. Rogers
|Combines themes of the Rapture and zombies

|- style="vertical-align:top"
|Story
|1989
|Disease
|"On the Far Side of the Cadillac Desert with Dead Folks"
|Joe R. Lansdale
|Bacteria causes the dead to rise. A bounty hunter chases his quarry and encounters an evil cult.

|- style="vertical-align:top;"
|Film
|1989
|Eco
|A Visitor to a Museum
|Konstantin Lopushansky
|In a post-apocalyptic world, the population is divided and decimated. In the depths of the sea exists "the Museum", which can only be reached during occasional periods of low tide when the sea becomes a barren desert.

|- style="vertical-align:top"
|Film
|1990
|War
|The Handmaid's Tale
|
|

|- style="vertical-align:top;"
|Novel
|1990–1994
|Fantasy
|The Death Gate Cycle
|
|Series of books which take place after the world has been unmade and remade by magic

|- style="vertical-align:top;"
|Novel
|1990–2013
|Supernatural, war
|The Wheel of Time series
|Robert Jordan
|An attempt by Aes Sedai researchers to tap into a newly discovered source of magic more advanced than the One Power leads to an experiment to bore a hole in the Pattern. It goes awry when it is discovered that the Bore leads to the Dark One's prison, allowing the Dark One to influence the world. This causes the male half of the One Power to be tainted, driving all male Aes Sedai mad and causing the Breaking of the World. The society regresses from futuristic to Renaissance-era, with only a few artifacts of the Age of Legends remaining.

|- style="vertical-align:top;"
|Film
|1990
|War
|Hardware
|
|

|- style="vertical-align:top;"
|Film
|1990
|War
|Robot Jox
|
|

|- style="vertical-align:top;"
|Television
|1990
|War
|The Girl from Tomorrow
|
|Australian children's drama in which a girl from the 31st century (after the Northern Hemisphere has been destroyed in the Great Disaster, later revealed to be a nuclear holocaust) becomes stranded in the 20th century. In the sequel, The Girl from Tomorrow Part II: Tomorrow's End (1993), she and her friends fight to prevent history from being changed in such a way that the Southern Hemisphere is destroyed as well.

|- style="vertical-align:top;"
|Comic
|1990–1991
|War
|The Last American
|
|Series originally from Marvel in 1990/1991, re-released by Com.X

|- style="vertical-align:top;"
|Novel
|1990
|War
|Nightfall
|Isaac Asimov, Robert Silverberg
|Extension written by Silverberg of the Asimov story of the same name

|- style="vertical-align:top;"
|Game
|1990
|War
|Mad Max
|
|A single-player NES game based on the movie Mad Max 2.

|- style="vertical-align:top;"
|Manga
|1990–1995
|War
|Battle Angel Alita
|Yukito Kishiro
|Manga series containing post-apocalyptic elements and taking place in a highly futuristic dystopian world

|- style="vertical-align:top;"
|Game
|1990
|War
|Rifts
|
|A nuclear exchange triggers the return of Ley Lines and Interdimensional Rifts or portals. These Ley Lines and Portals subsequently cause several natural and supernatural disasters.

|- style="vertical-align:top;"
|Film
|1990
|Disease
|A Wind Named Amnesia
|
| A mysterious plague has swept over the entire world, causing everyone to suffer from amnesia, leading to the collapse of civilization. Based on a novel by Hideyuki Kikuchi.

|- style="vertical-align:top;"
|Television
|1990
|Disease
|Not with a Bang
|
|ITV show, about three people who lived after everyone else in England was turned to dust by a chemical that was accidentally released by a television presenter

|- style="vertical-align:top;"
|Novel
|1990
|Disease
|The City, Not Long After
|Pat Murphy
|In the wake of a devastating worldwide plague, a handful of artists transform the city of San Francisco, and fend off marauders with a touch of magic

|- style="vertical-align:top;"
|Novel
|1990
|Disease
|A Gift Upon the Shore
|M. K. Wren
|

|- style="vertical-align:top;"
|Novel
|1990
|Divine prophecy
|Good Omens
|Neil Gaiman, Terry Pratchett
|

|- style="vertical-align:top;"
|Film
|1990
|Aliens
|I Come in Peace
|
|Also known as Dark Angel, directed by Craig R. Baxley

|- style="vertical-align:top;"
|Novel
|1990
|Aliens
|The Madness Season
|Celia S. Friedman
|

|- style="vertical-align:top;"
|Film
|1990
|Eco
|Mindwarp
|
|Taking place in the year 2037, the loss of the ozone layer has left most of the planet a desolate wasteland scattered with highly radioactive Death Zones.

|- style="vertical-align:top;"
|Film
|1990
|Eco
|Omega Cop
|
|After an environmental holocaust, a lone cop battles a gang of rampaging marauders.

|- style="vertical-align:top;"
|Novel
|1990
|Social Collapse
|Wolf and Iron
|Gordon R. Dickson
|A man and a wolf band together to survive in an America devastated by financial collapse

|- style="vertical-align:top;"
|Television
|1990–1991
|Technology
|Bucky O'Hare and the Toad Wars
|
|

|- style="vertical-align:top;"
|Television
|1990–1992
|Eco
|Captain Planet
|
|The Captain Planet two-part episode "Two Futures", in which the character Wheeler gets a glimpse of what could happen if damage to the environment was allowed to continue unchecked

|- style="vertical-align:top;"
|Novel
|1990–1994
|War
|Gan Moondark
|Donald E. McQuinn
|Trilogy Warrior, Wanderer, and Witch, set in the Pacific Northwest, generations after World War III

|- style="vertical-align:top;"
|Film
|1991
|War
|Delicatessen
|Marc Caro, Jean-Pierre Jeunet
|

|- style="vertical-align:top;"
|Novel
|1991
|War
|Yellow Peril
|Wang Lixiong (pseudonym Bao Mi)
|Tn the Chinese. About a nuclear civil war in the People's Republic of China

|- style="vertical-align:top;"
|Game
|1991
|War
|Armour-Geddon
|
|Game from Psygnosis

|- style="vertical-align:top;"
|Novel
|1991
|Eco
|Fallen Angels
|Michael Flynn, Larry Niven, Jerry Pournelle
|Space-based civilization exists despite the government's wishes during an ice age

|- style="vertical-align:top;"
|Game
|1991
|Eco
|"Dark Sun"
|
| A Dungeons and Dragons campaign setting by TSR, Inc. – focusing on a world that has been turned into an inhospitable desert by overuse of magic that destroyed the surrounding vegetation

|- style="vertical-align:top;"
|Novel
|1991–1995
|Future collapse
|The General series
|David Drake, S. M. Stirling
|

|- style="vertical-align:top;"
|Film
|1991
|Supernatural
|The Rapture
|
|

|- style="vertical-align:top;"
|Television
|1992
|War
|woops!
|
|Short-lived sitcom about the survivors of a nuclear war

|- style="vertical-align:top;"
|Game
|1992
|War
|Outlander
|
|A Mad Max-inspired driving game from 1992/93 for Snes and Genesis

|- style="vertical-align:top;"
|Novel
|1992
|Disease
|The Children of Men
|P. D. James
|

|- style="vertical-align:top;"
|Film
|1992
|Technology
|American Cyborg: Steel Warrior
|
|A film following the one woman who is able to conceive life after a third world war leaves the world's population sterile.

|- style="vertical-align:top;"
|Novel
|1992
|Monsters
|Skeletons
|Al Sarrantonio
|The galaxy passes through a 'cloud' in space, which causes all previously expired creatures on Earth to return to life as bloodthirsty skeletons shrouded in ghostly mirages of their former selves

|- style="vertical-align:top;"
|Game
|1992
|Aliens
|Galactix
|
|Backstory (featuring a satirical fake TV news story regarding the final depletion of the Amazon rain forest) and game play take place in (a fictional version of) the year 2019, in which a powerful alien attack force threatens to obliterate the Earth. Developed by Scott Host, for Cygnus Games (now Mountain King Studios).

|- style="vertical-align:top;"
|Manga
|1992–
|War
|X/1999
|Clamp
|

|- style="vertical-align:top;"
|Game
|1992
|Sun, aliens
|Epic and its 1994 sequel Inferno
|
|Published by Ocean Software (now Atari). A Battlestar Galactica-esque 3-D space shooter video game for MS-DOS and other contemporary (at that time) personal computing platforms.

|- style="vertical-align:top;"
|Song
|1992
|War
|"April 2031"
|
|Song by the band Warrant on their album Dog Eat Dog; depicts an Earth devastated by war where life lives on only by artificial means

|- style="vertical-align:top;"
|Film
|1993
|War
|Cyborg 2
|
|

|- style="vertical-align:top;"
|Film
|1993
|Eco
|Demolition Man
|
|

|- style="vertical-align:top;"
|Film
|1993
|War
|Robot Wars
|
|Sequel to Robot Jox

|- style="vertical-align:top;"
|Novel
|1993
|Disease
|Doomsday Book
|Connie Willis
|

|- style="vertical-align:top;"
|Film
|1993
|Aliens
|Body Snatchers
|
|Another film based on the novel The Body Snatchers by Jack Finney

|- style="vertical-align:top;"
|Game
|1993
|Aliens
|X-COM: UFO Defense and subsequent follow-ups
|
|The computer game.

|- style="vertical-align:top;"
|Novel
|1993
|Eco, Social Collapse
|Parable of the Sower
|Octavia E. Butler
|

|- style="vertical-align:top;"
|Film
|1993
|Eco
|The Last Border – Viimeisellä Rajalla
|
|One man's quest for revenge in a world where toxic waste has driven the remains of civilization into the Arctic Circle.

|- style="vertical-align:top;"
|Novel
|1993
|Eco
|The Fifth Sacred Thing
|Starhawk
|

|- style="vertical-align:top;"
|Novel
|1993
|Eco
|Deus X
|Norman Spinrad
|The results of global warming

|- style="vertical-align:top;"
|Novel
|1993
|Eco
|This Other Eden
|Ben Elton
|The Earth's population is forced to live in Biodomes for 50 years while the environment recovers from humanity's actions
|- style="vertical-align:top;"

|- style="vertical-align:top;"
|Game
|1993
|Eco
|Secret of Mana
|
|Takes place long after a time of environmental collapse that destroyed the world's older advanced civilizations

|- style="vertical-align:top;"
|Novel
|1993
|Technology
|Computer One
|Warwick Collins
|

|- style="vertical-align:top;"
|Novel
|1993
|Technology
|The Metamorphosis of Prime Intellect
|Roger Williams
|

|- style="vertical-align:top;"
|Game
|1993
|Technology
|RayForce
|
|Multia Japanese scrolling shooter arcade game

|- style="vertical-align:top;"
|Television
|1993
|Monsters
|Cadillacs and Dinosaurs
|
|Animated TV series in which dinosaurs reclaim Earth. Based on the comic book series Xenozoic Tales.

|- style="vertical-align:top;"
|Game
|1993–present
|Technology
|The Mega Man X series
|
|A video game series created by Capcom

|- style="vertical-align:top;"
|Game
|1993–present
|Supernatural
|The Doom series
|
|A computer game series created by id Software – about a demonic invasion of human colonies on the moons of Mars. The sequel to the original game, Doom II: Hell on Earth, sees the demons invading Earth itself.

|- style="vertical-align:top;"
|Television
|1994
|War
|Knight Rider 2010
|
|Made for TV movie that was designed to be a pilot for a post-apocalyptic spin-off from the original Knight Rider TV series

|- style="vertical-align:top;"
|Novel series
|1994–2001
|Eco
|The Greatwinter trilogy
|Sean McMullen
|Trilogy comprising Souls in the Great Machine, The Miocene Arrow, and Eyes of the Calculator. The first book was originally published as two books, starting in 1994. An ancient whale species recreated through a genetic experiment turns out to have been telepathic, and the whales issue a telepathic call which cause most of humanity and other large land mammals to walk into the oceans and drown.

|- style="vertical-align:top;"
|Television
|1994
|Disease
|Stephen King's The Stand
|
|TV miniseries

|- style="vertical-align:top;"
|Television
|1994
|Impact Event
|Highlander: The Animated Series
|
|

|- style="vertical-align:top;"
|Game
|1994
|Impact Event
|Illusion of Gaia
|
|A Super NES game where a comet passes next to Earth, which is a malicious being whose light turns humans into monsters. The story takes place in an altered reality, where the approaching comet already changed the timeline and reality.

|- style="vertical-align:top;"
|Game
|1994
|Supernatural
|Final Fantasy VI
|
|Titled Final Fantasy III in its initial American launch, this RPG features a plot twist in where villain Kefka moves magical statues out of their intended alignment, which in turn causes the balanced fictional world to fall into ruin, and Kefka to become its new god while protected by the powers of the same statues.

|- style="vertical-align:top;"
|Game
|1994
|Technology
|Metaltech: Earthsiege
|
|And its sequels, from Sierra Entertainment

|- style="vertical-align:top;"
|Game
|1994
|Technology
|Rise of the Robots
|
|Multi-developed by Mirage Studios. A fighting game.

|- style="vertical-align:top;"
|Game
|1994
|Technology
|System Shock
|
|Looking Glass Technologies – incorporates elements from the alien invasion theory.

|- style="vertical-align:top;"
|Game
|1994
|Impact event
|Primal Rage
|
|A fighting-style game where a meteor hits Earth and wipes out modern technology, reducing them to several Stone Age-type tribespeople. The continents are rearranged, and seven dinosaur-like deities fight for control over the new Urth.

|- style="vertical-align:top;"
|Novel
|1994–1996
|Future collapse
|Reaches
|David Drake
|

|- style="vertical-align:top;"
|Television
|1994
|Aliens, impact event
|Without Warning
|
|Directed by Robert Iscove, and originally broadcast over the CBS television network

|- style="vertical-align:top;"
|Novel
|1994
|Unspecified
|Vanishing Point
|Michaela Roessner
|Life in Silicon Valley 30 years after the mysterious and spontaneous disappearance of 90% of the world's population. The Winchester Mystery House ("The House") serves as a focal point for parallel universes and inexplicable energies that are changing the world and its post-Vanishing children.

|- style="vertical-align:top;"
|Manga
|1994–2006
|Eco
|Yokohama Kaidashi Kiko
|Hitoshi Ashinano
|Japanese manga series, set in a peaceful post-cataclysmic Japan, after an untold environmental disaster

|- style="vertical-align:top;"
|Film
|1995
|War
|Fist of the North Star
|
|Live-action martial arts film based on the manga of the same name

|- style="vertical-align:top;"
|Film
|1995
|War
|Judge Dredd
|
|

|- style="vertical-align:top;"
|Film
|1995
|Disease
|12 Monkeys
|
| Directed by Terry Gilliam – Based on La jetée (see above).

|- style="vertical-align:top;"
|Film
|1995
|Impact Event
|Tank Girl
|
|Loosely based on the comic book series by Jamie Hewlett

|- style="vertical-align:top;"
|Game
|1995
|Aliens
|Chrono Trigger
|
|The console game, where modern civilization is at risk of being destroyed by an alien parasite in AD 1999

|- style="vertical-align:top;"
|Film
|1995
|Eco
|Waterworld
|
|Global Warming has caused all landmasses on Earth to be covered by the sea. The remnants of humanity survive on "atolls," mechanical floating cities that are constantly attacked by pirates with steam-driven ships. Some humans have evolved to become amphibious to live among the old wreckage beneath the waves. Many people live in hope of finding the mythical "Dryland," the place safe from the seas (which turns out to be the Himalayan Mountains).

|- style="vertical-align:top;"
|Novel
|1995
|Eco
|Mother of Storms
|John Barnes
|A tactical nuclear strike in the North Pacific releases massive amounts of methane, spawning worldwide super-hurricanes

|- style="vertical-align:top;"
|Novel
|1995
|Eco
|Ill Wind
|Kevin J. Anderson, Doug Beason
|A microbe consumes all materials based on petroleum

|- style="vertical-align:top;"
|Film
|1995
|Technology
|Screamers
|
|

|- style="vertical-align:top;"
|Novel
|1995
|Supernatural
|The End of the Age
|Pat Robertson
|

|- style="vertical-align:top;"
|Novel series
|1995–2007
|Supernatural
|Left Behind
|
|Novel series concerning the Rapture

|- style="vertical-align:top;"
|Film
|1995
|War
|Fist of the North Star
|
|A live-action film based on the manga of the same name about a battle for control of a post World War III world.

|- style="vertical-align:top;"
|Novel
|1995/2005
|Eco
|The Mara and Dann novels
|Doris Lessing
|Mara and Dann and its sequel, Story of General Dann and Mara's Daughter, Griot and the Snow Dog, are set in a future ice age. Other Lessing novels, like Memoirs of a Survivor and Shikasta, also deal with apocalyptic themes.

|- style="vertical-align:top;"
|Other
|1995–
|War
|Ayreon
|Arjen Anthony Lucassen
|Series of concept albums depicting the end of life on Earth in 2084 due to, among other factors, a catastrophic nuclear war

|- style="vertical-align:top;"
|Comic
|1995
|Technology
|Tales of the Jedi: Dark Lords of the Sith
|
|Comics, great Droid Revolution

|- style="vertical-align:top;"
|Television
|1995
|Technology
|Space: Above and Beyond
|
|A subplot involves humanity fighting a race of cyborgs called Silicates.

|- style="vertical-align:top;"
|Game
|1995
|Technology
|I Have No Mouth, and I Must Scream
|
|From Cyberdreams

|- style="vertical-align:top;"
|Game
|1995
|Technology
|Vertical Force
|
|A vertical shoot-'em-up scroller game, with two layers for Nintendo's Virtual Boy video game system.

|- style="vertical-align:top;"
|Game
|1995
|Technology
|Red Alarm
|
|Nintendo

|- style="vertical-align:top;"
|Television
|1995
|Supernatural
|Neon Genesis Evangelion
|
|Humanity's unearthing of a being known as Adam brings about the Second Impact, a catastrophic shockwave which destroys Antarctica and subsequently leads to the extinction of thousands of organisms, the destruction of much of the civilized world, and the deaths of billions. Millions more die from the social and economic troubles which follow this impact and the ensuing wars.

|- style="vertical-align:top;"
|Game
|1995
|Supernatural
|Mortal Kombat 3
|
|The third installment of the Mortal Kombat series. Supernatural warlord Shao Kahn has taken over the realm of Earth, taking the souls of much of the populace. Extermination squads roam the land in search of the few surviving Kombatants that oppose him.

|- style="vertical-align:top;"
|Game
|1995–present
|Eco
|The Command & Conquer: Tiberian series
|
|A radioactive, self-replicating alien crystal known as Tiberium crashes on Earth in 1995 and gradually renders most of the Earth's surface uninhabitable over the next several decades.

|- style="vertical-align:top;"
|Film
|1996
|Eco
|Escape from L.A.
|
|The sequel to Escape From New York, the film is set in an America that has become a theocratic dictatorship. Central to the plot is Los Angeles Island, the remains of what was once the city of Los Angeles after "the Big One," where those who break the government's new laws are deported to.

|- style="vertical-align:top;"
|Film
|1996
|War
|Star Trek: First Contact
|
|A late-21st century Earth is devastated by nuclear conflict.

|- style="vertical-align:top;"
|Manga
|1996–2008
|Future collapse
|Trigun
|Yasuhiro Nightow
|

|- style="vertical-align:top;"
|Novel
|1996
|Future collapse
|Endymion
|Dan Simmons
|Plus a sequel called The Rise of Endymion

|- style="vertical-align:top;"
|Novel
|1996
|War
|Arc Light
|Eric L. Harry 
|Limited nuclear war between the United States and Russia

|- style="vertical-align:top;"
|Film
|1996
|Aliens
|Independence Day
|
|A fleet of alien warships appear over several Earth cities and lay waste to them.

|- style="vertical-align:top;"
|Film
|1996
|Aliens
|Mars Attacks!
|
|Based on the trading card series Mars Attacks (1962)

|- style="vertical-align:top;"
|Novel
|1996
|Aliens
|The Killing Star
|Charles Pellegrino, George Zebrowski
|Aliens conduct a preemptive strike against humanity with relativistic missiles

|- style="vertical-align:top;"
|Story
|1996
|Aliens
|War of the Worlds: Global Dispatches
|
|Edited by Kevin J. Anderson - an anthology of short stories set during the events of The War of the Worlds by H. G. Wells

|- style="vertical-align:top;"
|Film
|1996
|Technology
|Omega Doom
|

|- style="vertical-align:top;"
|Novel
|1996
|Technology
|Therefore I Am: The Tale of IG-88
|Kevin J. Anderson
|

|- style="vertical-align:top;"
|Game
|1996
|Human decline
|The House of the Dead
|
|The House of the Dead series of Sega video games. Scientist Dr. Curien finds a way to reanimate the dead, though not without disastrous results. Later in the series' timeline, Caleb Goldman uses the undead in his mission to destroy the human race and protect the Earth from further destruction by humans.

|- style="vertical-align:top;"
|Television
| data-sort-value="1996" | 1996, 1999
|Technology
|The Outer Limits
|
|The 1996 episode "Resurrection" and the 1999 episode "The Human Operators"

|- style="vertical-align:top;"
|Television
|1996–1997
|Impact Event
|After War Gundam X
|
|In the series' backstory, a brutal war sees multiple space colonies dropped on Earth, rendering much of the world uninhabitable.

|- style="vertical-align:top;"
|Game
|1996–present
|Disease
|Resident Evil
|
|A multi-video game series

|- style="vertical-align:top;"
|Television
|1997
|Sun
|"The Deconstruction of Falling Stars"
|J. Michael Straczynski
|An episode of Babylon 5

|- style="vertical-align:top;"
|Film
|1997
|War
|The Postman
|
|Partly based on the David Brin novel; starring Kevin Costner

|- style="vertical-align:top;"
|Novel series
|1997–
|Aliens
|Outlanders
|Mark Ellis (pseudonym James Axler)
|

|- style="vertical-align:top;"
|Game
|1997
|Disease
|POD: Planet of Death
|
|A mining accident unleashes a virus from within the colonized Jovian moon Io. Races are held to determine the winner of the last seat in the last shuttle leaving.

|- style="vertical-align:top;"
|Novel
|1997
|War
|Aftermath
|LeVar Burton
|American civilization crumbles after a civil war pitting blacks against whites and a devastating earthquake

|- vertical-align:top"
|Game
|1997
|Impact Event
|Dark Earth
|
|Set in an unspecified post-apocalyptic region on an Earth shrouded by an impact winter and plagued by a dangerous mutagenic substance called "Archessence" – the game centers on a technologically regressed medieval-like society.

|- style="vertical-align:top;"
|Game
|1997
|War
|Interstate '76
|
|Game from Activision

|- style="vertical-align:top;"
|Game
|1997
|War
|The KKnD series
|
|

|- style="vertical-align:top;"
|Television
|1997
|Impact Event
|Asteroid
|
|

|- style="vertical-align:top;"
|Novel
|1997
|Impact Event
|Titan
|Stephen Baxter
|About a crewed mission to Titan while China directs an asteroid to hit Earth

|- style="vertical-align:top;"
|Novel
|1997
|Aliens
|The Alien Years
|Robert Silverberg
|

|- style="vertical-align:top;"
|Novel
|1997
|Supernatural
|Shade's Children
|Garth Nix
|A novel in which a group of extradimensional beings invade Earth and cause all human adults over the age of 14 to vanish

|- style="vertical-align:top;"
|Game
|1997
|Aliens
|Spellcross
|
|Turn-based strategy game on PC

|- style="vertical-align:top;"
|Game
|1997
|Eco
|7th Legion
|
|PC game. The Chosen, a group consisting of a corporate- and government-determined human elect, depart a heavily polluted Earth via a fleet of starships, returning as a force to re-occupy Earth, fighting against the titular 7th Legion, a coalition of the most advanced post-apocalypse humans on Earth.

|- style="vertical-align:top;"
|Game
|1997
|Technology
|GURPS Reign of Steel
|
|A setting for the GURPS role-playing system, where machines have taken over the world after a war with humanity that the humans lost.

|- style="vertical-align:top;"
|Film
|1997
|Human decline
|The End of Evangelion
|
|All humankind are reverted to a "primordial soup" and merged into a single consummate being.

|- style="vertical-align:top;"
|Manga series
|1997–
|War
|Desert Punk
|Usune Masatoshi
|Later adapted into an anime series

|- style="vertical-align:top;"
|Film
|1997
|Unspecified
|Alien Resurrection
|
|Features a deleted scene (restored to the film in the Alien Quadrilogy box set) in which Ripley and the other survivors land the Auriga in a devastated Paris. The cause of the destruction is never made clear.

|- style="vertical-align:top;"
|Film
|1997
|Unspecified
|Trucks
|
|Canadian/American made-for-TV adaptation of the Stephen King short story by the same name.

|- style="vertical-align:top;"
|Game
|1997–present
|War
|The Fallout series
|
|A nuclear war in 2077 devastates much of the U.S. Players start out in underground shelters called Vaults.

|- style="vertical-align:top;"
|Film
|1998
|War
|Six-String Samurai
|
|

|- style="vertical-align:top;"
|Game
|1998
|War
|BattleTanx
|
|Vehicular combat game from The 3DO Company. Nearly all women around the world are killed in a nuclear war and the few female survivors are prized by men.

|- style="vertical-align:top;"
|Game
|1998
|War
|Vigilante 8
|
|Activision

|- style="vertical-align:top;"
|Novel
|1998
|Disease
|The Transall Saga
|Gary Paulsen
|

|- style="vertical-align:top;"
|Television
|1998
|Supernatural
|Silent Mobius
|Kia Asamiya
|The manga and subsequent anime movies and TV series set in a Blade Runner-style world which has been invaded by demonic beings.

|- style="vertical-align:top;"
|Novel
|1998
|Impact Event
|Moonfall
|Jack McDevitt
|

|- style="vertical-align:top;"
|Film
|1998
|Sun
|Last Night
|Don McKellar
|Follows the lives of several individuals as they cope with their final six hours on Earth before its apparent incineration by the Sun (the cause of the apocalypse is never directly stated)

|- style="vertical-align:top;"
|Film
|1998
|Aliens
|The Faculty
|
|Directed by Robert Rodriguez – six students are about to find out that their teachers are really from another planet

|- style="vertical-align:top;"
|Game
|1998
|Aliens
|Half-Life
|
|A resonance cascade causes extra-dimensional aliens to invade Earth

|- style="vertical-align:top;"
|Other
|1998
|Aliens
|Getter Robo Armageddon
|
|OVA, where a combination of a nuclear missile and amorphous alien Invaders results in a war with the fate of humanity at stake

|- style="vertical-align:top;"
|Novel
|1998
|Eco
|Aftermath
|Charles Sheffield
|Alpha Centauri goes supernova and causes cataclysmic climate change

|- style="vertical-align:top;"
|Novel
|1998
|Eco
|Dust
|Charles Pellegrino
|All the insect species on Earth die out, and the ecology crashes as a result

|- style="vertical-align:top;"
|Game
|1998
|Technology
|RayCrisis
|
|MultiA prequel to RayForce

|- style="vertical-align:top;"
|Game
|1998
|Supernatural
|Tribe 8
|
|A role-playing game in which sadistic demons invade (and conquer) Earth.

|- style="vertical-align:top;"
|Game
|1998
|Technology
|KKnD2: Krossfire
|
|The sequel to KKnD; as part of its plot, Series 9 are advanced farming robots that have taken it unto themselves to destroy all life

|- style="vertical-align:top;"
|Other
|1998
|Technology
|Obsolete
|
|Fear Factory

|- style="vertical-align:top;"
|Game
|1998
|Future collapse
|Xenogears
|
|PlayStation game set in a world with two nations fighting with weapons found in ancient ruins. Also, human fossils are all recent on the planet.

|- style="vertical-align:top;"
|Novel
|1998
|Disease
|Eternity Road
|Jack McDevitt
|1,700 years after a deadly plague has wiped out the great civilizations of man, the survivors' descendants have built up a new, comparably primitive society.

|- style="vertical-align:top;"
|Film
|1998
|Supernatural
|Apocalypse
|
|Also, the series of films made in the 1990s and 2000s by Cloud Ten Pictures

|- style="vertical-align:top;"
|Manga
|1998–present
|Disease
|Eden: It's an Endless World
|Hiroki Endo
|

|- style="vertical-align:top;"
|Game
|1998
|Aliens, technology (cyber-terrorism)
|Red Baron 2573
|
|

|- style="vertical-align:top;"
|Television
|1998–1999
|Eco
|Cowboy Bebop
|
|Disaster. The 1998–1999 anime series in which a man-made disaster has caused Earth's Moon to fragment, resulting in a constant rain of meteor strikes on the planet and forcing humanity to move out into the Solar System.

|- style="vertical-align:top;"
|Television
|1999
|War
|Now and Then, Here and There
|
|An anime series that takes place 10 billion years into the future, where humanity lusts for power and children are forced into military duty.

|- style="vertical-align:top;"
|Novel
|1999
|War
|Resurrection Day
|Brendan DuBois
|Set 10 years after the Cuban Missile Crisis, which escalated into nuclear war

|- style="vertical-align:top;"
|Game
|1999
|War
|BattleTanx: Global Assault
|
|Game from The 3DO Company – sequel to BattleTanx

|- style="vertical-align:top;"
|Game
|1999
|War
|Warzone 2100
|
|

|- style="vertical-align:top;"
|Television
|1999
|Disease
|Crusade
|
|A spin-off from the TV show Babylon 5

|- style="vertical-align:top;"
|Game
|1999
|Disease
|Abomination: The Nemesis Project
|
|Video game

|- style="vertical-align:top;"
|Television
|1999
|Impact Event
|The Last Train
|
|Cruel Earth in Canada. British TV six-part drama.

|- style="vertical-align:top;"
|Television
|1999
|Impact Event
|Thunderstone
|
|

|- style="vertical-align:top;"
|Game
|1999
|Aliens
|Chrono Cross
|
|The 1999 console game, where in alternate timelines modern civilization was destroyed by an alien parasite in AD 1999

|- style="vertical-align:top;"
|Novel
|1999
|Eco
|The Rift
|Walter Jon Williams
|

|- style="vertical-align:top;"
|Game
|1999
|Technology
|System Shock 2
|
|Sequel to System Shock

|- style="vertical-align:top;"
|Comic
|1999–2004
|Technology
|The Matrix Comics
|
|Originally released as webcomics

|- style="vertical-align:top;"
|Game
|1999
|Technology
|Galerians
|
|PlayStation, developed by Polygon Magic

|- style="vertical-align:top;"
|Game
|1999
|Technology
|Descent 3
|
|PC developed by Outrage Entertainment, which explains that mostly mining robots were attacked by an unknown virus and are now attacking people

|- style="vertical-align:top;"
|Television
|1999
|Human decline
|The Big O
|
|The Japanese manga and anime, where humans apparently suffered mass amnesia 40 years prior and are afraid to leave their city, Paradigm –  it is a sort of mecha/apocalypse subclass of its own; the protagonist has to battle mechanical beings and other robots who are trying to destroy the remnants of the human race.

|- style="vertical-align:top;"
|Game
|1999
|Future collapse
|Homeworld
|
|PCDeveloper Relic Entertainment – A small human civilization on the desert planet of Kharak on the edge of the galaxy is brought to the brink of extinction for violating a forgotten 5,000-year-old treaty forbidding them from developing hyperspace technology. The survivors, however, are fortunate to have the use of the recently completed Mothership – a large colony vessel meant to take them back to their ancient and forgotten homeworld near the center of the galaxy, Hiigara –  The game was succeeded by sequels Homeworld: Cataclysm and Homeworld 2.

|- style="vertical-align:top;"
|Game
|1999–2000
|War
|Sid Meier's Alpha Centauri
|
|A ship leaves Earth on the eve of World War III to found a new colony orbiting Alpha Centauri

|- style="vertical-align:top;"
|Television
|1999–2003
|Disease
|The Tribe
|
|New Zealand TV series that takes place in a near-future in which all the adults have been killed by a man-made virus and the children have to survive on their own

|- style="vertical-align:top;"
|Film
|1999–2003
|Technology
|The Matrix
|
|Series of films dealing with a future where machines have trapped humanity in an illusory world, and the struggle of the surviving humans of the post-apocalyptic real world to free the rest of humanity from the illusion

|- style="vertical-align:top;"
|Film
|2000
|War
|On the Beach
|
|A remake of the 1959 film.

|- style="vertical-align:top;"
|Game
|2000
|War
|Earth 2150
|
|Also Earth 2160 - the world is destroyed in 2150 and people settle on Mars in 2160

|- style="vertical-align:top;"
|Game
|2000
|Disease
|Deus Ex
|
|PC game in relation to the Gray Death

|- style="vertical-align:top;"
|Game
|2000
|Impact Event
|The Legend of Zelda: Majora's Mask
|
|A Nintendo 64 game where the main character, Link, has three days to save the world of Termina from its moon that has broken from orbit

|- style="vertical-align:top;"
|Manga series
|2000–2001
|War
|Saikano
|Shin Takahashi
|

|- style="vertical-align:top;"
|Film
|2000
|Aliens
|Battlefield Earth
|
|Based on the novel of the same name by L. Ron Hubbard

|- style="vertical-align:top;"
|Film
|2000
|Aliens
|Titan A.E.
|
|2000 animated post-apocalyptic dystopian science fiction

|- style="vertical-align:top;"
|Game
|2000
|Technology
|Gunlok
|
|A squad-based action-adventure computer game developed by Rebellion Developments

|- style="vertical-align:top;"
|Novel
|2000
|Supernatural
|Demons
|John Shirley
|Revolves around a demonic invasion of Earth

|- style="vertical-align:top;"
|Comic
|2000–2014
|Impact event, war
|Battle Angel Alita: Last Order
|Yukito Kishiro
|A continuation of the former manga series containing the same elements as the previous series, but goes into greater detail as to how the dystopia came about

|- style="vertical-align:top;"
|Television
|2000–2002
|Social Collapse
|Dark Angel
|James Cameron, Charles H. Eglee
|After terrorists detonate a nuclear weapon in the Earth's orbit, all computer data is destroyed, bringing about an economic collapse, but with minimal loss of life.

|- style="vertical-align:top;"
|Television
|2000–2005
|Future collapse
|Andromeda
|Gene Roddenberry
|

|- style="vertical-align:top;"
|Film
|2000–
|Supernatural
|Left Behind
|
|Film series based on the book series, concerning the Rapture

|- style="vertical-align:top;"
|Novel
|2000
|Eco
|The Last Book in the Universe
|Rodman Philbrick
|

|- style="vertical-align:top;"
|Story
|2001
|War
|"Autobahn nach Poznan"
|Andrzej Ziemianski
|

|- style="vertical-align:top;"
|Comic
|2001–2002
|Sun
|Just a Pilgrim
|Garth Ennis
|Limited series by Ennis depicting the adventures of a man traveling on Earth's surface a few years after a solar event called The Burn. Followed by a sequel, Just a Pilgrim: Garden of Eden.

|- style="vertical-align:top;"
|Novel
|2001–2005
|Monsters
|Trinity Blood
|Sunao Yoshida
|Illustrations by Thores Shibamoto – Light novel involving a war between humans and vampires

|- style="vertical-align:top;"
|Game
|2001–
|Aliens
|Halo series
|
|An alien alliance called the Covenant begin attacking human colonies in 2525. By 2552, almost all of the human colonies are destroyed and the Covenant are attacking Earth.

|- style="vertical-align:top;"
|Story
|2001
|Disease
|"After the Plague"
|T. Coraghessan Boyle
|Short story and collection

|- style="vertical-align:top;"
|Novel series
|2001
|War
|Mortal Engines Quartet
|Philip Reeve
|First book 2001. Set in the distant future after a nuclear war. Cities are turned into machines on wheels which hunt other cities and 'eat' them. The first book follows the story of two children who have fallen off a city, and are trying to find it again so they can get back on, while the dictator of their city plans on using a weapon to destroy all of the land dwellers – people who have not upgraded their cities to be on wheels.

|- style="vertical-align:top;"
|Game
|2001
|War
|Darwin's World
|
|A role-playing game from Impressions

|- style="vertical-align:top;"
|Film
|2001
|Disease
|Ever Since the World Ended
|
|A faux documentary set in San Francisco 12 years after a plague kills most of humanity and only 186 people remain in the city.

|- style="vertical-align:top;"
|Novel
|2001
|Disease
|Idlewild
|Nick Sagan
|

|- style="vertical-align:top;"
|Anime
|2001–2002
|Supernatural
|X/1999
|Clamp
|Anime in which the Seven Dragons of Heaven battle the Dragons of Earth to save the world

|- style="vertical-align:top;"
|Novel
|2001
|Disease
|The Night of the Triffids
|Simon Clark
|Sequel to The Day of the Triffids by John Wyndham

|- style="vertical-align:top;"
|Game
|2001
|Disease
|After the Bomb
|
|Role-playing game

|- style="vertical-align:top;"
|Novel
|2001
|Impact Event
|The Peshawar Lancers
|S.M. Stirling
|

|- style="vertical-align:top;"
|Game
|2001
|Impact Event
|Ace Combat 04: Shattered Skies
|
|PlayStation 2 game centered in a fictional continent years after an asteroid crashes at several locations

|- style="vertical-align:top;"
|Game
|2001
|Supernatural
|Final Fantasy X
|
|A role-playing game, in which an advanced civilization is threatened and destroyed by supernatural forces that religion is knowingly, and in some ways unknowingly, centered on.

|- style="vertical-align:top;"
|Film
|2001
|Human decline
|A.I.
|
|Depicts human extinction after 2,000 years

|- style="vertical-align:top;"
|Film
|2001
|Aliens
|Final Fantasy: The Spirits Within
|
|CGI animated film about spirit-based aliens roaming Earth after an asteroid crash over 30 years before

|- style="vertical-align:top;"
|Game
|2001
|Technology
|Outlive
|
|A real-time strategy. Earth created robotic lifeforms allegedly to mine Titan's resources, though in reality they were to be used as a secret army. When the plan surfaced, the World Council lost power but the robots returned and occupied the planet in the name of their creators.

|- style="vertical-align:top;"
|Game
|2001
|Human decline
|Pikmin
|
|And its sequel, the 2004 video game Pikmin 2, is set on an unnamed planet simply called as the planet of the Pikmin, inhabited by animals and plants. Although it is unnamed in-game, several cutscenes show it as Earth, or at least a very Earth-like planet. Further hints are man-made objects in both games like the Abstract Masterpiece, a bottle cap, and the Remembered Old Buddy, a R.O.B., as well as the stage based on the Pikmin planet in Super Smash Bros. Brawl, Distant Planet, which its data refers to as Earth.

|- style="vertical-align:top;"
|Film
|2001
|Monsters
|Kairo
|Kiyoshi Kurosawa
|In which the world is overrun by humanoid ghosts, and everything is destroyed by them. Based on a novel of the same name.

|- style="vertical-align:top;"
|Game
|2001
|Sun
|Tetris Worlds
|
|

|- style="vertical-align:top;"
|Television
|2001–2002
|Technology
|Digimon Tamers
|
|

|- style="vertical-align:top;"
|Film
|2002
|War
|Equilibrium
|
|After barely surviving another worldwide conflict, humanity rejects all emotion and outlaws all forms of expression which might encourage emotional response.

|- style="vertical-align:top;"
|Television
|2002
|Human decline
|The Future Is Wild
|
|Uses computer animation to simulate the sort of creatures that may evolve from present-day animals. In the world depicted in the series, the human race has left Earth to colonize the stars. The future descendants of humanity have sent probes back to Earth to record what has become of it.

|- style="vertical-align:top;"
|Television
|2002
|War
|Saikano
|
|Anime series

|- style="vertical-align:top;"
|Film
|2002
|Zombies
|28 Days Later
|
|Ordinary citizens are forced to fight through hordes of rabid zombies after a virus ravages Britain

|- style="vertical-align:top;"
|Film
|2002
|Disease
|Teenage Caveman
|
|Directed by Larry Clark - set in the post-apocalyptic future where after the majority of humans die from a mysterious viral plague, the remaining humans have conformed to primitive tribalism

|- style="vertical-align:top;"
|Television
|2002
|Disease
|Smallpox
|
|TV movie

|- style="vertical-align:top;"
|Novel
|2002
|Disease
|The Years of Rice and Salt
|Kim Stanley Robinson
|Set in a world devastated by the Black Death in medieval Europe, which killed 99% of the European population before they could discover the Americas

|- style="vertical-align:top;"
|Game
|2002
|Disease
|Soldiers of Anarchy
|
|PC video game featuring a group of ex-soldiers who spent 10 years underground after the Spontaneous Genome Degeneration Syndrome (SGDS), an artificially created virus raged across the globe in 2004, nearly wiping off humanity. Although the virus was released to make money with the antidote, it was not distributed for some reason.

|- style="vertical-align:top;"
|Film
|2002
|Impact Event
|The Time Machine
|
|Downfall of man caused by the Moon breaking apart and bombarding Earth with rocks after extensive lunar mining

|- style="vertical-align:top;"
|Film
|2002
|Aliens
|Signs
|
|Directed by M. Night Shyamalan

|- style="vertical-align:top;"
|Film
|2002
|Eco
|Jason X
|
|The 10th Friday the 13th film - Earth became a polluted wasteland by 2455, so humanity left Earth and colonized a planet designated as Earth 2

|- style="vertical-align:top;"
|Game
|2002
|Eco
|The Legend of Zelda: The Wind Waker
|
| Video game in which a flood has decimated the fictional world of Hyrule

|- style="vertical-align:top;"
|Novel
|2002
|Technology
|The Butlerian Jihad
|Kevin J. Anderson
|Part of the Dune universe

|- style="vertical-align:top;"
|Film
|2002
|Monsters
|Reign of Fire
|
|Dragons wreak havoc and destroy human civilization

|- style="vertical-align:top;"
|Television
|2002–2003
|War
|Mobile Suit Gundam Seed
|
|Anime series involving a war between naturally-born humans (Naturals) and genetically enhanced humans (Coordinators)

|- style="vertical-align:top;"
|Television
|2002–2003
|Eco
|Overman King Gainer
|
|Anime series, which depicts humanity living in domes after an ecological disaster

|- style="vertical-align:top;"
|Game
|2002–2004
|War
|Neocron
|
|Game for the Personal Computer by Reakktor Media

|- style="vertical-align:top;"
|Television
|2002–2004
|Disease
|Jeremiah
|
|Showtime cable television series, based on the comic book of the same name. In the year 2021, 15 years after a virus kills everyone over the age of puberty, the child survivors have grown up, living on the scraps of the old world.

|- style="vertical-align:top;"
|Novel
|2002–2004
|Technology
|The Legends Of Dune trilogy
|
|Part of the Dune universe

|- style="vertical-align:top;"
|Comic
|2002–2008
|Disease
|Y: The Last Man
|
|Comic book series that features a lone man and his pet monkey as the last living male mammals in a world populated only by women; series written by Brian K. Vaughan and published by Vertigo Comics

|- style="vertical-align:top;"
|Comic
|2002
|War
|Hulk: The End
|
|Bruce Banner/The Hulk is the last human on earth around 200 years after a nuclear war has turned the planet into a nuclear wasteland.

|- style="vertical-align:top;"
|Novel
|2002–2004
|Eco
|The Snowfall Trilogy
|Mitchell Smith
|Novel trilogy comprising Snowfall, Kingdom River, and Moonrise. North America has retreated into hunter-gatherer societies and military kingdoms some 500 years after an apocalyptic ice age

|- style="vertical-align:top;"
|Comic
|2003
|War
|Judge Dredd vs. Aliens
|
|

|- style="vertical-align:top;"
|Film
|2003
|Unspecified
|Dream Warrior
|
|

|- style="vertical-align:top;"
|Television
|2003
|Human decline
|Wolf's Rain
|
|This manga/anime series takes place in a post-apocalyptic world, where constant conflicts between nobles leaves whole parts of the earth uninhabited, cities in ruins, and technology rare. Only the nobles possess futuristic ships, and the richest have domed cities where the debilitated Earth can still support life. Wolves are proclaimed extinct, but found a way to enchant humans. Five wolves are on a quest to find 'Paradise', along with a Flower-Maiden, who was created from a Lunar Flower by a Noble. A second apocalypse ends the series, with a presumable renewing of the planet. Four of the five characters are seen in the renewed world.

|- style="vertical-align:top;"
|Song
|2003
|Unspecified
|Absolution
|
|Apocalyptic album by the band Muse

|- style="vertical-align:top;"
|Film
|2003
|War
|Deathlands: Homeward Bound
|
|Based on the book series Deathlands

|- style="vertical-align:top;"
|Film
|2003
|War
|Time of the Wolf
|
|

|- style="vertical-align:top;"
|Novel
|2003
|War
|The City of Ember
|Jeanne DuPrau
|A novel set in an underground city 241 years after a nuclear war.

|- style="vertical-align:top;"
|Novel
|2003
|War
|Revelation by Lord JohnPl. Apokalipsa wedlug Pana Jana
|Robert J. Szmidt
|

|- style="vertical-align:top;"
|Novel
|2003
|War
|The Third World War
|Humphrey Hawksley
|

|- style="vertical-align:top;"
|Game
|2003
|War
|Judge Dredd: Dredd Vs. Death
|
|Game

|- style="vertical-align:top;"
|Novel
|2003
|Disease
|Full Circle
|David Mitchell
|

|- style="vertical-align:top;"
|Film
|2003
|Human decline
|Le Temps du Loup
|
|Michael Haneke's film (The Time of the Wolf) follows a family through the (French?) countryside after an undefined catastrophic collapse of civilization.

|- style="vertical-align:top;"
|Story
|2003
|Impact Event
|Shikari in Galveston
|
|

|- style="vertical-align:top;"
|Novel
|2003
|Supernatural
|The Rising
|Brian Keene
|Plus its sequel City of the Dead. Rather than the zombies being an infection, as in most zombie fiction; these zombies are reanimated by demonic entities, the Sisquisim, from the Old Testament.

|- style="vertical-align:top;"
|Novel series
|2003
|Aliens
|Vampire Earth
|E. E. Knight
|

|- style="vertical-align:top;"
|Game
|2003
|Aliens
|UFO: Aftermath
|
|The computer game and its sequels UFO: Aftershock and UFO: Afterlight by Altar Games

|- style="vertical-align:top;"
|Film
|2003
|Eco
|Dragon Head
|
|Based on the manga of the same name

|- style="vertical-align:top;"
|Film
|2003
|Eco
|It's All About Love
|
|

|- style="vertical-align:top;"
|Novel
|2003
|Eco
|Oryx and Crake
|Margaret Atwood
|

|- style="vertical-align:top;"
|Novel
|2003
|Eco
|Clade
|Mark Budz
|

|- style="vertical-align:top;"
|Television
|2003
|Eco
|Encrypt
|
|Set in the year 2068, the Earth's surface is in a cataclysmic upheaval, much of it transformed into wasteland by unstoppable storms (the byproduct of the destruction of the ozone layer). It was directed by Oscar Luis Costo.

|- style="vertical-align:top;"
|Film
|2003
|Technology
|Galerians: Rion
|
|

|- style="vertical-align:top;"
|Other
|2003
|Technology
|The Protomen
|The Protomen
|The band's self-titled album

|- style="vertical-align:top;"
|Novel
|2003
|Technology
|Robota
|Orson Scott Card, Doug Chiang
|Also illustrated by Chiang.

|- style="vertical-align:top;"
|Novel
|2003
|Technology
|The Machine Crusade
|Kevin J. Anderson
|Part of the Dune universe

|- style="vertical-align:top;"
|Game
|2003
|Technology
|Neuroshima
|
|The Polish role-playing game from Portal Publishing

|- style="vertical-align:top;"
|Game
|2003
|Social Collapse
|Deus Ex: Invisible War
|
|Ion Storm (developer)Eidos Interactive(publisher). After total global economic collapse (an event known simply as "The Collapse", all religion is collected into one, which is in conflict with the new world order. Throughout the game, the player can choose to be on either side, affecting the game's outcome.

|- style="vertical-align:top;"
|Novel
|2003–2007
|Aliens
|The Legacy Trilogy
|Ian Douglas
|

|- style="vertical-align:top;"
|Film
|2004
|War
|Appleseed
|
|

|- style="vertical-align:top;"
|Film
|2004
|War, Technology
|Casshern
|
|Based on two Japanese anime series. A race of super-robots led by their leader, Black King, take over the world.

|- style="vertical-align:top;"
|Novel
|2004
|War
|Cloud Atlas
|David Mitchell
|One of the six novellas by Mitchell set in a post-apocalyptic future

|- style="vertical-align:top;"
|Novel
|2004
|War
|The People of Sparks
|Jeanne DuPrau
|The second book in DuPrau's City of Ember series.

|- style="vertical-align:top;"
|Novel
|2004–2009
|Human decline
|Biomega
|Tsutomu Nihei
|Followed the manga NOiSE, Blame! and Net Sphere Engineer by Nihei. Published between 2004 and 2009

|- style="vertical-align:top;"
|Film
|2004
|Zombies
|Dawn of the Dead
|
|Individuals try and survive a zombie outbreak by securing a shopping mall. Remake of the 1978 movie.

|- style="vertical-align:top;"
|Novel
|2004
|War
|Cowl
|Neal Asher
|

|- style="vertical-align:top;"
|Other
|2004–
|Impact event
|Compilation of Final Fantasy VII
|
|Includes video games, short stories, and animated features; revolves largely around the fate of a planet which is ravaged by the impact a giant meteor/asteroid, summoned by magic; published between 2004 and 2009

|- style="vertical-align:top;"
|Novel
|2004
|War
|Fitzpatrick's War
|Theodore Judson
|

|- style="vertical-align:top;"
|Game
|2004
|Aliens
|Half-Life 2
|
|Game from Valve; the game is set in 20 years after an multidimensional organization successfully takes over Earth in 7 hours, transforming humans into a slave labor force.

|- style="vertical-align:top;"
|Novel
|2004
|Disease
|A Planet for the President
|Alistair Beaton
|

|- style="vertical-align:top;"
|Novel
|2004
|Disease
|White Devils
|Paul McAuley
|

|- style="vertical-align:top;"
|Film
|2004
|Impact Event
|Post Impact
|
|The asteroid Bay-Leder 7 was found to be powerful enough to wipe out the whole civilization. Although a top-secret experimental satellite weapon was able to cut it in two, the smaller piece impacted in West Russia, turning Europe into an ice-covered "death zone".

|- style="vertical-align:top;"
|Film
|2004
|Eco
|The Day After Tomorrow
|
|Based in part on the novel The Coming Global Superstorm by Art Bell and Whitley Strieber

|- style="vertical-align:top;"
|Novel
|2004
|Eco
|Crache
|Mark Budz
|

|- style="vertical-align:top;"
|Novel
|2004–
|Unspecified
|The Emberverse series
|S. M. Stirling
|Series of novels and short stories. A disaster of indeterminate cause (most speculation within the novels concerns an all-powerful outside force, often facetiously referred to as "alien space bats") causes electricity, combustion engines, and modern explosives to cease functioning.

|- style="vertical-align:top;"
|Novel
|2004
|Eco
|The Snow
|Adam Roberts
|The world is buried under kilometers of unnatural snow

|- style="vertical-align:top;"
|Television
|2004
|Eco
|10.5
|
|The 2004 miniseries 10.5 and its 2006 follow-up 10.5: Apocalypse; in which a series of earthquakes tears America apart, separating the West Coast from the rest of the U.S.

|- style="vertical-align:top;"
|Game
|2004
|Eco
|The Fall: Last Days of Gaia
|
|PC - A German 3D role-playing game situated in a post-apocalyptic future where humanity is facing its possible end. The focus of the game is the deep story and the unique characters, with living environment offering many well-thoughtout sidequests. Gameplay similar to the Fallout series, although with a more traditional RPG approach in which the player can assemble a whole party in order to improve chances in battles and include specialists with complementary skills.

|- style="vertical-align:top;"
|Film
|2004
|Technology
|Sky Captain and the World of Tomorrow
|
|

|- style="vertical-align:top;"
|Comic
|2004
|War
|The Punisher: The End
|

|- style="vertical-align:top;"
|Novel
|2004
|Technology
|The Battle of Corrin
|Kevin J. Anderson
|Part of the Dune universe

|- style="vertical-align:top;"
|Manga series
|2004
|Technology
|Deus Vitae
|Takuya Fujima
|

|- style="vertical-align:top;"
|Novel
|2004
|Supernatural
|The Taking
|Dean Koontz
|A novel in which a malevolent demonic force kills off the majority of the human race

|- style="vertical-align:top;"
|Game
|2004
|Supernatural
|The Shadow of Yesterday
|
|A role-playing game in which the unification of all people in a fantasy world under a single, supernatural language results in the destruction of a world by what is presumed to be an asteroid that becomes that world's new Moon, one that eclipses the Sun for a week out of each month.

|- style="vertical-align:top;"
|Television
|2004
|Technology
|Zentrix
|
|

|- style="vertical-align:top;"
|Game
|2004
|Technology
|Splicers
|
|A role-playing game set in the midst of a war between humans and a worldwide computer intelligence

|- style="vertical-align:top;"
|Game
|2004
|Technology
|Planetarian: The Reverie of a Little Planet
|
|MultiIs a Japanese post-apocalyptic visual novel

|- style="vertical-align:top;"
|Film
|2004
|Human decline
|Idiocracy
|
|Takes the premise that with no natural predators to thin the population of the world, evolution simply rewards whoever can pass on their genes the fastest, who are depicted as sexually promiscuous, drunken brutes. The average IQ is 80 by 2100, 60 by 2200, and 40 by 2505.

|- style="vertical-align:top;"
|Anime
|2004–2005
|War
|Desert Punk
|
|Series set in a future Japan that is a wasteland. In the Great Kanto Desert, scattered humans eke out a living in the hot sand.

|- style="vertical-align:top;"
|Novel
|2004–2007
|Disease
|The Uglies Trilogy
|Scott Westerfeld
|Uglies, Pretties, Specials and the companion novel, Extras, take place in a future civilization that arose after our current civilization collapsed because of an engineered bacterium that attacked not people, but oil, changing its chemical composition so that it exploded on contact with oxygen (first explained on p. 345 of Uglies).

|- style="vertical-align:top;"
|Novel
|2005
|Supernatural
|The Restoration series
|Terri Blackstock
|Novel series covering how people react and survive after a natural EMP blast from a distant star knocks out all electronics all over the world

|- style="vertical-align:top;"
|Television
|2005
|War
|"Dance of the Dead"
|
|An episode of Masters of Horror directed by Tobe Hooper – it has a triple apocalyptic theme as it features a man-made virus causing a zombie outbreak after World War III.

|- style="vertical-align:top;"
|Novel
|2005
|War
|The Goodness Gene
|Sonia Levitin
|Children's book

|- style="vertical-align:top;"
|Novel
|2005
|War
|Metro 2033
|Dmitry Glukhovsky
|Set in the metro tunnels of post-apocalyptic Moscow. A man named Artyom journeys to the central city of the metro, Polis, to find answers about a possible threat called the Dark Ones.

|- style="vertical-align:top;"
|Film
|2005
|Disease
|Æon Flux
|
| Based on MTV's animated series Æon Flux

|- style="vertical-align:top;"
|Game
|2005
|Impact Event
|Guild Wars
|
|PCA game in which, after a tutorial area set in a "pre-Searing" time, a race of beasts called the Charr summon meteors down upon the humans, destroying nearly all of the cities and all of the life (plants, animals, etc.)

|- style="vertical-align:top;"
|Film
|2005
|Aliens
|Alien Apocalypse
|
|Produced by the Sci Fi Channel

|- style="vertical-align:top;"
|Film
|2005
|Aliens
|War of the Worlds
|
|Directed by Steven Spielberg, along with the independent 2005 productions H.G. Wells' The War of the Worlds and H. G. Wells' War of the Worlds, all based on the H. G. Wells novel.

|- style="vertical-align:top;"
|Novel
|2005
|Aliens
|War of the Worlds: New Millennium
|Douglas Niles
|A retelling of the original The War of the Worlds story, but displaces the events to 2005. It is not a sequel, but an update.

|- style="vertical-align:top;"
|Television
|2005
|Sun
|"The End of the World"
|
|An episode of the television series Doctor Who.

|- style="vertical-align:top;"
|Novel
|2005–2012
|Supernatural
|Power of Five
|
|A series of fantasy and suspense novels, published between 2005 and 2012.

|- style="vertical-align:top;"
|Television
|2005
|
|End Day
|
|A UK television series

|- style="vertical-align:top;"
|Radio
|2005
|Technology
|"Humans Are Dead"
|
|Flight of the Conchords

|- style="vertical-align:top;"
|Novel
|2005
|Aliens
|Eight Worlds
|John Varley
|

|- style="vertical-align:top;"
|Game
|2005
|Aliens
|Destroy All Humans!
|
|The 2005 console game, in which the player controls a Furon alien in an attempt to overthrow humanity.

|- style="vertical-align:top;"
|Film
|2005
|Eco
|Serenity
|
|The Earth's resources and biosphere get used up, prompting a mass exodus for the stars.

|- style="vertical-align:top;"
|Film
|2005
|Eco
|A Sound of Thunder
|Peter Hyams
|A group of travelers traveled in time and made changes in the past, which led to colossal alterations in the future where they came from, and in less than in a week everything in the world started changing chaotically, putting in the life of every living thing in danger.

|- style="vertical-align:top;"
|Story
|2005
|Eco
|The Garden Where My Rains Grows
|Brian Keene
|Set in a post-apocalyptic world where it started raining one day and never stopped

|- style="vertical-align:top;"
|Film
|2005
|Technology
|9
|
|

|- style="vertical-align:top;"
|Novel
|2005
|Technology
|How to Survive a Robot Uprising
|Daniel H. Wilson
|A semi-satirical book.

|- style="vertical-align:top;"
|Television
|2005–2006
|Future collapse
|Noein
|
| This anime features several teens living in Hakodate, Hokkaido who come in contact with their future selves using time travel as a last resort to end the destruction of their world by abducting their dear friend Haruka Kaminogi from the past as a sacrifice to make the ultimate weapon against the destroyer known as Noein.

|- style="vertical-align:top;"
|Television
|2005–2006
|Aliens
|Eureka Seven
|
|Anime series and its video games are set 10,000 years after humans had to leave Earth due to a Coralian appearing in Africa. In the current timeline, the remnants of humanity are now settled on a planet they refer to as the "Promised Land".

|- style="vertical-align:top;"
|Play
|2005
| War and gang violence
|Mercury Fur
|Philip Ridley
|

|- style="vertical-align:top;"
|Television
|2005–2006
|Eco
|Zoids: Genesis
|
|Anime series where an earthquake triggers a series of worldwide natural disasters that devastate Planet Zi

|- style="vertical-align:top;"
|Comic
|2005–2007
|Technology
|Lego Exo-Force
|
|Comics and books

|- style="vertical-align:top;"
|Radio
|2005–present
|Eco
|Nebulous
|Graham Duff
|Radio sitcom in which much of the world was destroyed by an event known as "the Withering"

|- style="vertical-align:top;"
|Film
|2006
|War
|9/Tenths
|
|About the conflict between a wealthy couple and a poor laborer after a worldwide terrorist attack isolates them in a small remote ranch

|- style="vertical-align:top;"
|Game
|2006
|War
|DEFCON
|
|Created by independent British game developer Introversion Software, and inspired (in part) by the 1983 film WarGames

|- style="vertical-align:top;"
|Comic
|2006–
|Unspecified
|Wasteland
|
|Comic series, which takes place roughly 100 years in the future, where North America is a dust bowl and lacking modern technology

|- style="vertical-align:top;"
|Film
|2006
|War
|The Beach Party at the Threshold of Hell
|
|Dark comedy directed by Jonny Gillette

|- style="vertical-align:top;"
|Film
|2006
|War
|The Dark Hour
|
|The eight-year-old boy Jesús has been living in a crumbling underground facility since he was born with eight survivors of an apocalyptic war.

|- style="vertical-align:top;"
|Television
|2006
|War
|Jericho
|
|CBS – the residents of a small Kansas town remain isolated in the aftermath of a series of nuclear attacks on America

|- style="vertical-align:top;"
|Novel
|2006
|War
|The Book of Dave
|Will Self
|Split between modern London and post-apocalyptic London where a new society and religion is based on the legacy of a cab driver

|- style="vertical-align:top;"
|Novel
|2006
|War
|Deadlands
|Scott A. Johnson
|

|- style="vertical-align:top;"
|Game
|2006
|War
|Auto Assault
|
|While seemingly caused by aliens, it is in fact human mistakes, breakdown and war that forges Auto Assault'''s apocalyptic world. Similar to the Command & Conquer series where an alien event is the catalyst needed to start decline.

|- style="vertical-align:top;"
|Film
|2006
|Zombies
|The Zombie Diaries|
|British made movie in which a virus creates a plague of zombies, viewed entirely from the POV of a character's video camera. This film was made and completed before George A. Romero's film Diary of the Dead which was shot in a similar POV perspective.

|- style="vertical-align:top;"
|Television
|2006
|Human decline
|Korgoth of Barbaria|
|Cartoon Network/Adult Swim animated parody

|- style="vertical-align:top;"
|Novel
|2006
|Disease
|Pandemia|Christopher Knight, Johnathan Rand
|A mutated bird flu virus wipes out everyone except the young. Set in Michigan.

|- style="vertical-align:top;"
|Novel
|2006
|Zombies
|World War Z|Max Brooks
|Novel about a global zombie outbreak and humanity's efforts to stop them

|- style="vertical-align:top;"
|Poem
|2006
|Disease
|Quarantine|Brian Henry
|

|- style="vertical-align:top;"
|Television
|2006
|Impact Event
|Three Moons Over Milford|
|

|- style="vertical-align:top;"
|Novel
|2006
|Impact Event
|Life as We Knew It|Susan Beth Pfeffer
|An asteroid strikes the Moon and knocks it into an orbit closer to Earth, concentrates on how a family in western Pennsylvania is affected

|- style="vertical-align:top;"
|Game
|2006
|Aliens
|Gears of War|
|The video game, which takes place on the fictional planet of Sera; humans are shown fighting a war against alien monsters that have emerged from underground.

|- style="vertical-align:top;"
|Film
|2006
|Eco
|The World Sinks Except Japan|
|A parody of Japan Sinks – all the land on Earth sinks into the ocean, with Japan being the last one to go

|- style="vertical-align:top;"
|Novel
|2006
|Eco
|Small-Minded Giants|Oisín McGann
|

|- style="vertical-align:top;"
|Television
|2006
|Eco
|Innocent Venus|
|Set after the world population and economy is devastated by simultaneous hyper-hurricanes

|- style="vertical-align:top;"
|Novel
|2006
|War
|The Prophet of Yonwood|Jeanne DuPrau
|The third book in DuPrau's City of Ember series

|- style="vertical-align:top;"
|Game
|2006
|Eco
|Battlefield 2142|
|PC first-person shooting game about a war fought over land unaffected by a new ice age that renders most of the Northern Hemisphere uninhabitable

|- style="vertical-align:top;"
|Television
|2006
|Eco
|Ergo Proxy|
|Anime series by the Japanese production company Manglobe – an undefined global ecological disaster has decimated the surface of Earth, and the small remaining human population lives in isolated, city-state dome complexes

|- style="vertical-align:top;"
|Film
|2006
|Unspecified
|Android Apocalypse|
|TV movie for the Sci Fi Channel

|- style="vertical-align:top;"
|Television
|2006
|Technology
|Lego Exo-Force|
|

|- style="vertical-align:top;"
|Film
|2006
|Human decline
|Children of Men|
|The human race has become infertile. Based on the book of the same name.

|- style="vertical-align:top;"
|Novel
|2006
|Zombies
|Cell|Stephen King
|A strange cell phone signal turns ordinary humans into killer zombies

|- style="vertical-align:top;"
|Film
|2006
|Zombies
|The Quick and the Undead|
|

|- style="vertical-align:top;"
|Film
|2006, 2008
|Supernatural
|Pulse|
|And its sequels Pulse 2: Afterlife (2008) and Pulse 3: Invasion (2008)

|- style="vertical-align:top;"
|Novel
|2006
|Supernatural
|The Conqueror Worms|Brian Keene
|A Lovecraftian tale of one of the last survivors on Earth. In the novel the world floods, causing several monsters to appear, mainly gigantic, man-eating earthworms.

|- style="vertical-align:top;"
|Film
|2006
|Social Collapse
|Puzzlehead|
|James Bai (writer/director) – set in what looks like Brooklyn "after the decline", the streets are empty and there seems to be constant random killings

|- style="vertical-align:top;"
|Novel
|2006
|Unspecified
|Night Work|Thomas Glavinic
|A novel in which a man wakes up to find that everyone else has disappeared

|- style="vertical-align:top;"
|Game
|2006
|Unspecified
|Mother 3|
|Game Boy - in which a small group of humans escape to a post-apocalyptic utopia after the "old world" is destroyed. While the game never explains what happened to the "old world", they say that the humans were the ones that caused its destruction.

|- style="vertical-align:top;"
|Novel
|2006
|Unspecified
|The Road|Cormac McCarthy
|After the end of the world, a father and son attempt to survive while traveling through the ruins of the United States

|- style="vertical-align:top;"
|Television
|2007
|War
|Masters of Science Fiction|
|Episode "A Clean Escape"

|- style="vertical-align:top;"
|Novel
|2007
|War
|Last Light|Alex Scarrow
|Sudden end of oil availability leads to worldwide social collapse

|- style="vertical-align:top;"
|Novel
|2007
|War
|The Pesthouse|Jim Crace
|

|- style="vertical-align:top;"
|Novel
|2007
|War
|The Slynx|Tatyana Tolstaya
|

|- style="vertical-align:top;"
|Novel
|2007
|War
|The World Ends in Hickory Hollow|Ardath Mayhar
|

|- style="vertical-align:top;"
|Film
|2007
|Zombies
|28 Weeks Later|
|Sequel to 28 Days Later. During the efforts to re-populate Britain, the discovery of a possible cure to the "Rage" virus may also begin the apocalypse all over again.

|- style="vertical-align:top;"
|Film
|2007
|Disease
|I Am Legend|
|In an abandoned New York City set in 2012, military virologist Robert Neville tries to find a cure to a man-made virus that killed almost everyone on Earth, while at the same time trying to survive against the vampiric zombies that it left behind. The third film adaptation of Richard Matheson's 1954 novel I Am Legend.

|- style="vertical-align:top;"
|Film
|2007
|Disease
|I Am Omega|
|A low-budget fourth film adaptation of Richard Matheson's 1954 novel I Am Legend made by The Asylum to capitalize on the release of the third film adaptation I Am Legend.

|- style="vertical-align:top;"
|Game
|2007
|Impact event
|Godzilla: Unleashed|
|PC video game, from Pipeworks, set in the post-apocalyptic Earth in which Earth has been destroyed by crystals

|- style="vertical-align:top;"
|Film
|2007
|Zombies
|Resident Evil: Extinction|
|

|- style="vertical-align:top;"
|Novel
|2007
|Disease
|Plague Year|Jeff Carlson
|Slated to be a trilogy

|- style="vertical-align:top;"
|Film
|2007
|Impact Event
|Super Comet: After The Impact|
|A speculative documentary produced by the Discovery Channel which hypothesizes the effects on modern-day earth of a large comet impact.

|- style="vertical-align:top;"
|Film
|2007
|Aliens
|The Invasion|
|Based on the novel The Body Snatchers by Jack Finney. A mysterious virus brought by space-borne microbes possesses humans and renders them devoid of emotion.

|- style="vertical-align:top;"
|Film
|2007
|Aliens
|Invasion of the Pod People|
|A low-budget remake of Invasion of the Body Snatchers made by The Asylum to capitalize on the release of The Invasion.

|- style="vertical-align:top;"
|Film
|2007
|Aliens
|Transformers|
|A race of robotic aliens battle for humanity.

|- style="vertical-align:top;"
|Game
|2007
|Eco
|Darkwind: War on Wheels|
|PC-MMOGA disastrous solar event in 2019 and 2020 leaves the world devastated, with only small pockets of human survivors scratching out a living in a bleak, irradiated world. Largely fueled by the stockpiles of hardware left behind by a dead civilization combined with the desperation of a new world order, the gladiatorial deathsports begin around 2035. The vast expanses of wilderness between the towns are menaced by gangs of road pirates armed with heavily armed cars and trucks and traveled by equally well armed trade groups, making a living by carrying food, fuel, and other specialist equipment between the towns.

|- style="vertical-align:top;"
|Film
|2007
|Technology
|Meet the Robinsons|
|

|- style="vertical-align:top;"
|Film
|2007
|Human decline
|Tooth and Nail|
|A group of survivors, called Foragers, take cover in an old abandoned hospital where the group attempt to re-build society. All we know of the apocalypse is that man "Ran out of gas", but not in the sense of oil, just that our time was up.

|- style="vertical-align:top;"
|Television
|2007
|Monsters
|Gurren Lagann|
|Animated TV series in which cloned "Beastmen" fight an apocalyptic battle with humanity

|- style="vertical-align:top;"
|Game
|2007
|Technology
|Toxic|
|Nitrome Limited – flash game by about a character in a yellow hazmat suit attempting to free the world from a race of robots with a variety of bombs. A sequel, Toxic 2, was released in 2008.

|- style="vertical-align:top;"
|Film
|2007
|Zombies
|REC|Jaume Balagueró, Paco Plaza
|Spanish horror film about humans altered by a demon

|- style="vertical-align:top;"
|Game
|2007
|Future collapse
|Supreme Commander|
|PC, Xbox - set at the end of a thousand-year-long war called the Infinite War between three separate factions; the UEF (United Earth Federation), the Aeon and the Cybrans.

|- style="vertical-align:top;"
|Film
|2007
|Sun
|Sunshine|
|Directed by Danny Boyle – the film follows a spaceship crew in the year 2057 who are tasked with reigniting Earth's dying sun

|- style="vertical-align:top;"
|Game
|2007–
|Aliens
|Crysis|
|Crytek – a near future where an ancient alien spacecraft has been discovered beneath the ground on an island in the East Philippines

|- style="vertical-align:top;"
|Game
|2007
|Supernatural
|Hellgate: London|
|A PC game where humans and demons are in constant struggle on Earth.

|- style="vertical-align:top;"
|Television
|2007
|Unspecified
|Afterworld|
|American series about a man living in a post-apocalyptic United States after an unspecified cataclysm

|- style="vertical-align:top;"
|Game
|2007–2012
|Technology
|The Mass Effect series
|
|Humanity and other alien races must work together to combat sentient machines called the Reapers from destroying all advanced life in the galaxy

|- style="vertical-align:top;"
|Song
|2007
|Technology
|"Citizens of Tomorrow"
|Tokyo Police Club
|Single

|- style="vertical-align:top;"
|Film
|2007–present
|Supernatural
|Rebuild of Evangelion|
|Remake of the Neon Genesis Evangelion anime series. The first of the four films, Evangelion: 1.0 You Are (Not) Alone, debuted in 2007; the second, Evangelion: 2.0 You Can (Not) Advance, in 2009; and the third, Evangelion: 3.0 You Can (Not) Redo, in 2012. The fourth is forthcoming.

|- style="vertical-align:top;"
|Game
|2007
|War, supernatural
|Fire Emblem: Radiant Dawn|
|At the end of Part 3, the main characters are forced to deliberately awaken the supposed "dark god" Yune in order to avoid her being awoken accidentally by a war which has spread across Tellius. The goddess Ashera, upon learning that the beorc and laguz have long since broken a covenant forbidding military conflict between the races, petrifies nearly all inhabitants of Tellius despite Yune's protests. This calamity leads into Part 4, where Yune, while considering how to revive the petrified people, tasks the survivors with preventing Ashera from finishing the job.

|- style="vertical-align:top;"
|Film
|2007
|Unspecified
|The Gene Generation|
|Directed by Pearry Reginald Teo

|- style="vertical-align:top;"
|Film
|2008
|Zombies
|Zombie Wars|
|Directed by David A. Prior

|- style="vertical-align:top;"
|Game
|2008
|Supernatural
|The Legend of Spyro: Dawn of the Dragon|
|The game's main antagonist Malefor the Dark Master claims that it is the destiny of all purple dragons to bring about the world's destruction. He is almost successful when the Destroyer, a massive golem he resurrected to cross the Belt of Fire and issue the world's end, completes its circle until he is defeated by the game's protagonist Spyro and Cynder and sealed away by the ancient dragons' spirits into the world's core and Spyro unleashes a powerful Fury wave to rebuild the world.

|- style="vertical-align:top;"
|Television
|2008–2011
|Eco, Supernatural, Technology
|Yu-Gi-Oh! 5D's|
|Zero Reverse was a disastrous event in which the evolutionary use of quantum mechanics in the Enerdy system led to its reactor exploding and causing a massive tectonic shift that separated a chunk of Domino City from the rest of the landmass, splitting it in two and creating an island later known as Satellite, which was the area hit hardest by the energy release, while the Earthbound Immortals were released from the Underworld.

|- style="vertical-align:top;"
|Film
|2008
|War
|20 Years After|
|Twenty years after wars, plague, and natural disasters, a young woman follows the voice of a lone radio broadcaster and delivers the first child born in 15 years.

|- style="vertical-align:top;"
|Television
|2008
|Unspecified
|Aftermath: Population Zero|
|A speculative documentary that looks at what would happen to the earth if the entire human race suddenly disappeared.

|- style="vertical-align:top;"
|Film
|2008
|War
|City of Ember|
|Based on the book of the same name by Jeanne DuPrau

|- style="vertical-align:top;"
|Film
|2008
|War
|Mutant Chronicles|
|Based on the Mutant Chronicles role-playing game

|- style="vertical-align:top;"
|Novel
|2008
|War
|Flood|Stephen Baxter
|Book about huge underground oceans leaking to the surface, lifting sea levels by thousands of meters over several decades

|- style="vertical-align:top;"
|Novel
|2008
|War
|The Hunger Games trilogy
|Suzanne Collins
|Young adult series about a survival tournament set in a post-apocalyptic continent

|- style="vertical-align:top;"
|Novel
|2008
|Eco
|Flood|
|Earth is gradually submerged due to seismic activity that brings more water to the surface.

|- style="vertical-align:top;"
|Novel
|2008
|War
|The Valley-Westside War|Harry Turtledove
|

|- style="vertical-align:top;"
|Game
|2008
|Impact event
|Advance Wars: Days of Ruin|
|With virtually all of humanity wiped out by a meteor strike, the game follows the exploits of an army of survivors, fighting bandit raiders and hostile armies across the planet's desolate remains.

|- style="vertical-align:top;"
|Game
|2008
|War
|Exodus|
|A post-apocalyptic role-playing game from Glutton Creeper Games set after the War on Terror destroy 99% of the world's population.

|- style="vertical-align:top;"
|Film
|2008
|Disease
|Doomsday|
|

|- style="vertical-align:top;"
|Film
|2008
|Disease
|Repo! The Genetic Opera|
|

|- style="vertical-align:top;"
|Film
|2008
|Disease
|The Last Man|
|Based upon Mary Shelley's 1826 novel The Last Man|- style="vertical-align:top;"
|Television
|2008
|Disease
|Survivors|
|BBC television series, a remake of the 1970s series of the same name

|- style="vertical-align:top;"
|Novel
|2008
|Disease
|The Martian General's Daughter|
|Collapse of global civilization caused by virus-like nanotechnology

|- style="vertical-align:top;"
|Game
|2008
|Zombies
|Left 4 Dead|
|Multiplayer video game released by Valve. Featuring people transformed into crazed zombie-like mutants by an infection. The game diverges from the traditional zombie trope with the inclusion of "special infected" or zombies with specialized traits.

|- style="vertical-align:top;"
|Novel
|2008
|Impact Event
|The Dead and the Gone|Susan Beth Pfeffer
|How the same event as in Life as We Knew It affects a family in New York City

|- style="vertical-align:top;"
|Novel
|2008
|Aliens
|The Host|Stephenie Meyer
|An alien race, called Souls, take over Earth and its inhabitants. The novel follows one Soul's predicament when the mind of its human host refuses to cooperate with her takeover.

|- style="vertical-align:top;"
|Film
|2008
|Eco
|The Happening|
|The movie depicts an unknown deadly neurotoxin.

|- style="vertical-align:top;"
|Film
|2008
|Eco
|Lost City Raiders|
|

|- style="vertical-align:top;"
|Film
|2008
|Eco
|WALL-E|
|Earth is abandoned in 2105 after becoming too polluted to sustain life. WALL•E robots have been left behind to clean up Earth, but all but one remains active as of 2805.

|- style="vertical-align:top;"
|Television
|2008
|Eco
|"The Poison Sky"
|
|A Doctor Who episode. The poisonous Sontaran gases (creating the titular "poison sky") above Sylvia and Wilfred's street ignite as the flames from the Doctor's atmospheric converter spread globally.

|- style="vertical-align:top;"
|Game
|2008
|Technology
|Too Human|
|

|- style="vertical-align:top;"
|Film
|2008
|Zombies
|Quarantine|
|American remake of the 2007 Spanish horror film REC|- style="vertical-align:top;"
|Television
|2008
|Zombies
|Dead Set|
|A UK television series which chronicles a zombie outbreak

|- style="vertical-align:top;"
|Novel
|2008
|Supernatural
|Therefore Repent!|Jim Munroe
|illustrated by Salgood Sam. A post-Rapture graphic novel

|- style="vertical-align:top;"
|Television
|2008
|Social Collapse
|"Turn Left"(Doctor Who story #197)
|Russell T. Davies
|Explores an apocalyptic parallel universe in which British society has collapsed due to the death of the Doctor

|- style="vertical-align:top;"
|Novel
|2008
|Social Collapse
|World Made By Hand|James Kunstler
|Explores life in an agrarian village in upstate New York after America collapses under the combined trauma of plague, peak oil, global warming, and nuclear terrorism

|- style="vertical-align:top;"
|Film
|2008
|Unspecified
|Life After People|
|A TV documentary film and its spin-off Life After People: The Series document life on Earth after all humans have instantly disappeared. The shows do not mention a cause of their disappearance.

|- style="vertical-align:top;"
|Novel
|2008
|War
|The Diamond of Darkhold|Jeanne DuPrau
|The fourth book in DuPrau's City of Ember series

|- style="vertical-align:top;"
|Television
|2008–2009
|Technology
|Terminator: The Sarah Connor Chronicles|
|

|- style="vertical-align:top;"
|Film
|2009
|Eco
|Astro Boy|
|Astro Boy (a robotic version of his creator's lost son) lives in highly advanced Metro City; the last of its kind floating above the clouds in the skies of post-apocalyptic Earth.

|- style="vertical-align:top;"
|Film
|2009
|Disease
|Carriers|
|A group of four people on the road trying to find a safe haven while plague rages across the U.S..

|- style="vertical-align:top;"
|Film
|2009
|Disease
|Daybreakers|
|A virus changes most of the populace into vampires sometime around 2019. At the point where vampirism is considered "normal", the remaining humans attempt to escape being farmed for their blood, while also attempting to find a cure.

|- style="vertical-align:top;"
|Film
|2009
|Zombies
|La Horde|
|Directed by Benjamin Rocher. The film is set in one of the French tower blocks, wherein a small group of people trying to make their way out of it thrust through hordes of zombies.

|- style="vertical-align:top;"
|Novel
|2009
|Disease
|The Killing Moon|Rod Glenn
|Five friends struggle to survive 20 years after the collapse of civilization. Set in northern England.

|- style="vertical-align:top;"
|Game
|2009
|Zombies
|Left 4 Dead 2|
|The sequel to Left 4 Dead. Expands upon the original game with new characters, maps, and weapons.

|- style="vertical-align:top;"
|Film
|2009
|Disease
|Autumn|
|

|- style="vertical-align:top;"
|Game
|2009
|Disease
|Killing Floor|
|PCCooperative first-person shooter video game.

|- style="vertical-align:top;"
|Television
|2009–2010
|Supernatural
|Supernatural|
|Seasons 4 and 5 were based around the pre-apocalyptic world in which the angels are gearing up for a battle between Heaven and Hell.

|- style="vertical-align:top;"
|Film
|2009
|Eco
|2012|
|

|- style="vertical-align:top;"
|Novel
|2009
|Eco
|The Windup Girl|Paolo Bacigalupi 
|In future Thailand, where calories are the most needed energy source, an unexpected girl struggles to live like as she wants

|- style="vertical-align:top;"
|Television
|2009
|Eco
|Earth 2100|
|Time travel fiction. The 2009 ABC special Earth 2100 explores a possible future if humans do not take actions to help the ecosystem, which could prove to be disastrous. Lucy, the speaker, explains about this world and wonders how she was one of the lucky humans to have survived.

|- style="vertical-align:top;"
|Film
|2009
|Technology
|9|
|Adaptation of the 2005 film 9|- style="vertical-align:top;"
|Television
|2009
|Technology
|Power Rangers: RPM (American adaptations of Engine Sentai Go-onger)
|
|The Power Rangers protect the last remnants of humanity, who are now settled in the domed city of Corinth, after the accidental release of a government created computer virus known as "Venjix". Malicious and self-aware, it leaves most of the planet in nuclear fallout, constructs an army of attack-bots and begins cybernetic experiments on human prisoners.

|- style="vertical-align:top;"
|Novel
|2009
|Zombies
|The Forest of Hands and Teeth|Carrie Ryan
|Set generations after the zombie apocalypse, a girl struggles against the religious order in her village hoping for life beyond the fences protecting them from the Unconsecrated (zombies) in the surrounding forest

|- style="vertical-align:top;"
|Film
|2009
|Zombies
|REC 2|Jaume Balagueró, Paco Plaza
|The sequel to the 2007 Spanish horror film REC|- style="vertical-align:top;"
|Film
|2009
|Sun
|Knowing|
|A film where the end of the world, caused by a solar flare erupting onto the Solar System, is accurately predicted.

|- style="vertical-align:top;"
|Novel
|2009
|War, Terrorism
|The War After Armageddon|Ralph Peters
|Islamic extremists launch a series of dirty bomb attacks against the West, which results in a backlash against Muslims. A radical Christian government takes over the U.S. and sends the Army, Marines, and a National Guard full of evangelicals to invade and retake a long-nuked Israel.

|- style="vertical-align:top;"
|Novel
|2009
|Social Collapse
|Patriots: A Novel of Survival in the Coming Collapse|James Wesley Rawles
|An apocalyptic survivalist novel about a total socioeconomic collapse

|- style="vertical-align:top;"
|Film
|2009
|Unspecified
|Les derniers jours du monde|
|A French film. Depicts the story of a man, Robinson, who travels across France and Spain during the end of the world.

|- style="vertical-align:top;"
|Film
|2009
|Unspecified
|The Road|
|A film based upon the novel The Road by Cormac McCarthy.

|- style="vertical-align:top;"
|Song album
|2009
|Unspecified
|Songs from the Floodplain|Jon Boden
|

|- style="vertical-align:top;"
|Novel
|2009
|Technology
|One Second After|
|

|- style="vertical-align:top;"
|Comic
|2009 to present
|Disease
|Sweet Tooth|Jeff Lemire
|Also illustrated by Lemire, and published by Vertigo Comics. About a young human/deer hybrid, who has survived an apocalyptic plague

|- style="vertical-align:top;"
|Television
|2009–2011
|Aliens
|V|
|Remake of the 1980s television series

|- style="vertical-align:top;"
|Television
|2009–2010
|Disease
|The Colony|
| Reality television style drama about a group of survivors forced to live in a warehouse in the virus-ravaged city of Los Angeles, California

|- style="vertical-align:top;"
|Game
|2009–present
|War
|Fallen Earth|
|A post-apocalyptic massively multiplayer online role-playing game from Icarus Studios and Fallen Earth LLC set in the 22nd century after the Shiva Virus has spread all over the world.

|- style="vertical-align:top;"
|Television
|2009
|Eco
|Tokyo Magnitude 8.0|
|After a massive earthquake in Tokyo 25 km under the sea at a magnitude of 8.0, siblings Mirai and Yūki, who were visiting a robot exhibition in Odaiba at the beginning of their summer vacation, struggle to reach their parents in their house in Setagaya, assisted by a female motorcycle courier named Mari, who is striving to reach her own daughter and mother in Sangenjaya. Together, the three brave the ruined city and try their best to make it home safely.

|-
|Novel
|2009
|Magic/Mysticism
|The Age of Misrule|
|Trilogy of novels (World's End, Darkest Hour, and Always Forever) by Mark Chadbourn following several characters in England through the slow collapse of modern technological civilization as the previously suppressed world of natural magic and mystical, godly beings rises to take over the course of human events

|- style="vertical-align:top;"
|Comic
|2009–present
|Titans
|Attack on Titan|
|Humanoid creatures or Titans are gigantic human flesh-eating monsters that lived outside of the humanity's curtain Wall Maria and the civilization was on the verge of extinction, but some are forced to fight back by joining the military, called Survey Corps. But there are some humans that transform into Titans to fight and kill other humans and Titans.

|- style="vertical-align:top;"
|Comic
|2009
|Impact event
|Homestuck|
|A webcomic where children play a game called Sburb which causes multiple meteors to hit Earth. They survive by abandoning Earth.

|- style="vertical-align:top;"
|Film
|2009
|Zombies
|Zombieland|
|A geeky college kid and three strangers he meets travel west in an attempt to find a sanctuary free from zombies.

|- style="vertical-align:top;"
|Story
|2009
| Eco, Aliens
|The Day of the Troll|Simon Messingham
|An Audio exclusive Doctor Who New Series Adventures story. The Doctor arrives in the far future where Britain is a wasteland and encounters a small group of scientists trying to find a way to grow crops.

|-
|Television
|2009
|Impact Event, Monsters
|The Day of the Triffids|
|Loose adaptation of John Wyndham's novel. A solar event blinds most of the people in the world allowing a new life form to assert itself, and the few remaining sighted people try to survive.

|- style="vertical-align:top;"
|Television
|2010–2018
|War
|Adventure Time|
|The adventures of Jake the dog and Finn, the only known remaining human in the post-apocalyptic land of Ooo hundreds of years after the "Great Mushroom War".

|- style="vertical-align:top;"
|Film
|2010
|War
|The Book of Eli|
|Although never directly stated, enormous craters can be seen throughout the film and characters mention an event called "the Flash". The writer, Gary Whitta, stated he wanted the audience to figure out the nuclear event slowly.

|- style="vertical-align:top;"
|Game
|2010
|Variable (involving psychics)
|Apocalypse World|
|Tabletop role-playing game (TTRPG) set after an apocalypse of the group's choosing

|- style="vertical-align:top;"
|Game
|2010
|Supernatural, war
|Darksiders|
|Game series by THQ set in a post-apocalyptic Earth where mankind faces near-extinction and angels fight a losing battle against the demon hordes for control over the world

|- style="vertical-align:top;"
|Game
|2010
|War
|Metro 2033|
|Game by 4A Games and THQ for the PC and Xbox 360 set in post-apocalyptic Moscow 20 years after a nuclear war

|- style="vertical-align:top;"
|Film
|2010
|Zombies
|Resident Evil: Afterlife|
|

|- style="vertical-align:top;"
|Film
|2010
|Zombies
|Survival of the Dead|
|On an island off the coast of North America, local residents simultaneously fight a zombie epidemic while hoping for a cure to return their undead relatives back to their human state. Directed by George A. Romero

|- style="vertical-align:top;"
|Television
|2010
|Disease
|After Armageddon|
|TV film about a family trying to survive after a global outbreak

|- style="vertical-align:top;"
|Novel
|2010
|Disease
|Dog Eat Dog|David J. Rodger
|Ten years after a devastating global pandemic, the lives of two survivors collide in a sequence of events that threaten both their sanity and their lives

|- style="vertical-align:top;"
|Novel
|2010
|Disease
|The Passage|Justin Cronin
|A virus turns humanity into vampire-esque creatures, leading to the collapse of civilization, while the survivors eke out a bleak existence

|- style="vertical-align:top;"
|Film
|2010
|Impact Event
|Meteor Apocalypse|
|A gigantic meteor enters Earth's orbit and begins to disintegrate, showering the entire planet with debris.

|- style="vertical-align:top;"
|Film
|2010
|Impact Event
|Quantum Apocalypse|
|A comet makes an unexpected turn towards the earth where all life may cease to exist within days if small town heroes fail to find a solution.

|- style="vertical-align:top;"
|Television
|2010–2012
|Technology
|Generator Rex|
|Rex is an evo working with the military organization Providence to put an end to the outbreak of violent monstrous human mutations known as evos which are created when people are exposed to unsafe nanites, a nanobot technology developed to fight diseases within humans. Wars between evos and humans ensued when nanites started to get out of control.

|- style="vertical-align:top;"
|Film
|2010
|Aliens
|Skyline|
|Aliens invade Earth and attempt to steal the brains of its citizens

|- style="vertical-align:top;"
|Film
|2010
|Aliens
|Battle: Los Angeles|
|Depicts the attempts of U.S. Marines to repel an alien invasion of Earth

|- style="vertical-align:top;"
|Television
|2010–2015
|Aliens
|Falling Skies|
| Aliens or creatures called Skitters, Mechs and Overlords attack Earth; the series is showing the struggles six months after the initial attack on Earth

|- style="vertical-align:top;"
|Novel
|2010
|Eco
|Drain|Davis Schneiderman
|Lake Michigan mysteriously empties of water and an end-of-time cult occupies the lake bed, waiting for a re-flooding of the zone by the power of a giant worm

|- style="vertical-align:top;"
|Novel
|2010
|Supernatural
|Sword of My Mouth|Jim Munroe
|Illustrated by Shannon Gerard. A follow-up to Therefore Repent!.

|- style="vertical-align:top;"
|Novel
|2010
|Social Collapse
|Julian Comstock: A Story of 22nd-Century America|
|Decline of world civilization caused by the depletion of oil reserves

|- style="vertical-align:top;"
|Novel
|2010
|Unspecified
|Be Ready When the Sh*t Goes Down: A Survival Guide to the Apocalypse|Forrest Griffin
|A comedy survivalist book

|- style="vertical-align:top;"
|Novel
|2010
|Unspecified
|Cygnis|Vincent Gessler
|A novel in which Syn the trapper and Ack, his cybernetic wolf, survive in a world covered with forests, facing robots and humans

|- style="vertical-align:top;"
|Game
|2010
|Eco
|A New Beginning|
|A video game by Daedalic Entertainment, in which climate change has made the Earth uninhabitable.

|- style="vertical-align:top;"
|Television
|2010–
|Zombies
|The Walking Dead|Frank Darabont
|A television series featuring the world overrun by zombies

|- style="vertical-align:top;"
|Film
|2010
|War
|Bunraku|
|In the aftermath of a global war, the surviving nations introduced a ban on all firearms in an attempt to quell man's appetite for destruction.

|- style="vertical-align:top;"
|Game
|2010
|War
|Fist of the North Star: Ken's Rage|
|PlayStation 3 and Xbox 360 game by Omega Force and Tecmo Koei based on the landmark anime and manga series

|- style="vertical-align:top;"
|Film
|2010
|Monsters
|Stake Land|
|An orphaned boy seeks safety and family amidst the vampire apocalypse.

|- style="vertical-align:top;"
|Film
|2010
|Monsters
|Monsters|Gareth Edwards
|Written, shot, and directed by Edwards.

|- style="vertical-align:top;"
|Film
|2011
|Supernatural
|Vanishing on 7th Street|
| 

|- style="vertical-align:top;"
|Game
|2011
|Eco
|Brink|
|MultiA floating self-sustaining city contains what may be the final remnants of humanity, after global warming causes sea levels to rise

|- style="vertical-align:top;"
|Novel
|2011
|Technology
|Robopocalypse: A Novel|Daniel H. Wilson
|An apocalyptic robot/machine uprising novel

|- style="vertical-align:top;"
|Novel
|2011
|Social Collapse
|Survivors: A Novel of the Coming Collapse|James Wesley Rawles
|An apocalyptic survivalist novel about a total socioeconomic collapse

|- style="vertical-align:top;"
|Game
|2011
|Impact event
|Rage|
|Video game by iD Software; set after a meteor collision with the Earth

|- style="vertical-align:top;"
|Film
|2011
|Disease
|Perfect Sense|
|A worldwide pandemic of unknown origin causes every human to begin losing their five traditional senses one at a time.

|- style="vertical-align:top;"
|Film
|2011
|Disease
|Priest|
|A century-spanning war between humans and vampires has devastated Earth's surface and led to a theocracy called The Church.

|- style="vertical-align:top;"
|Film
|2011
|Zombies
|Zombie Musical
|Ryan McHenry
|A short musical in which a young girl deals with the Zombie apocalypse on her first day of school

|- style="vertical-align:top;"
|Novel
|2011
|Disease
|Enclave|Ann Aguirre
|

|- style="vertical-align:top;"
|Film
|2011
|Unknown power affecting only men
|Schoolgirl Apocalypse|
|A Japanese schoolgirl, Sakura, finds her average life in a small town turned inside out when all the males suddenly become zombies and begin to attack and kill females. 
With few skills and only her kyūdō bow and an English textbook to accompany her, she sets out on a journey through a dark world of murder and survival.

|- style="vertical-align:top;"
|Game
|2011
|Disease
|Hatoful Boyfriend|
|A particularly virulent strain of bird flu kills a large majority of humanity, leaving birds to become the dominant class of animals. The protagonist is one of the few humans naturally resistant to the flu.

|- style="vertical-align:top;"
|Game
|2011
|Disease
|Infamous 2|
|A plague, primarily on the eastern coast of the United States, is spreading rapidly, causing diseases over the majority of those infected and granting special abilities to some individuals, designated as Conduits, while one of them, Cole MacGrath, in the Evil alternative ending of the game, manages to absorb the powers of his rival John White, who had been renamed "The Beast" due to the rampage he caused by the use of his powers over several weeks, and united most mutants under his leadership while waging a successful battle against the authorities, while Joseph Bertrand, a corrupt tycoon who had been secretly transforming into a bestial form known as the "Behemoth", managed before dying to sell the technology mutating normal individuals, usually into either poisonous reptilian monsters or muscular savages with control over ice, to several terrorists, including Osama bin Laden.

|- style="vertical-align:top;"
|Game
|2011
|Aliens
|DC Universe Online|
|The promotional trailer shows many trademark DC Comics heroes and villains fighting each other to the death with Lex Luthor emerging as the ultimate victor, but immediately after the culmination of the traditional battle between those legendary characters, Brainiac, according to statements, manages to conquer Earth unhindered by its defeated protectors (as most of them have already ended up killing each other) and enslave humanity's population, until Luthor alongside Batman manage to survive and time travel back towards the past to warn their respective factions to cease their everlasting war and cooperate against the approaching enemy, with the custom player-controlled heroes contributing for the preparation of both previously hostile sides to confront the anticipated invasion as soon as it arrives.

|- style="vertical-align:top;"
|Novel
|2011
|Supernatural
|The Leftovers|Tom Perrotta
|Survivors try to continue with life after a rapture-like event

|- style="vertical-align:top;"
|Novel series
|2011
|Technology
|Wool|Hugh Howey
|

|- style="vertical-align:top;"
|Game
|2011
|Collapse of infrastructure, and fissures in races
|MotorStorm: Apocalypse|
|A PlayStation 3 video game that depicts the West Coast of the U.S. hit by several disasters, like tornadoes, earthquakes, rains, and thunderstorms.

|- style="vertical-align:top;"
|Game
|2011
|War
|Wasteland Angel|
|A PC game that depicts the US after World War III.

|- style="vertical-align:top;"
|Film
|2011
|War
|The Divide|
|A film about the psychological unraveling of a group of survivors, who have holed up in the basement of their apartment building during a nuclear attack.

|- style="vertical-align:top;"
|Novel
|2012
|Eco
|Zoo 
|James Patterson
|Due to human activities, animals become more aggressive and begin killing humans

|- style="vertical-align:top;"
|Film
|2012
|War
|The Hunger Games|
|Set in a post-apocalyptic world in the country of Panem where the countries of North America once existed. Based on the book of the same name by Suzanne Collins.

|- style="vertical-align:top;"
|Film
|2012
|Impact Event
|Seeking a Friend for the End of the World|
|An asteroid is announced to hit Earth as a man searches to find his significant other before the impact occurs.

|- style="vertical-align:top;"
|Television
|2012–2014
|Technology collapse
|Revolution|
|All technology ceases after a global blackout.

|- style="vertical-align:top;"
|Television
|2012
|Impact Event
|Evacuate Earth|
|Hypothetical docudrama concerning humanity's efforts to seek out a new home on a distant Earth-like planet, in the face of Earth's eventual destruction by an approaching neutron star. Produced by Atlas Media, for original broadcast on the National Geographic Channel.

|- style="vertical-align:top;"
|Film
|2012
|Zombies
|Christmas with the Dead|
|A freak lightning storm turned all who saw it into zombies.

|- style="vertical-align:top;"
|Game
|2012
|War, Alien, Disease
|Call of Duty: Black Ops II|
|Edward Richtofen, a Nazi German scientist attempting to succeed in conquering the world during World War II despite the failure of Adolf Hitler, creates an army of zombies as well as various advanced infantry weapons and biological enhancements using an alien substance, called Element 115, and invades a space station on the Moon while cooperating with American Patrick Dempsey, Soviet Nikolai Belinski and Japanese Takeo Masaki in his effort to survive from the zombie horde until he manages to control it, and succeeds in transforming the Earth into a wasteland (after attacking it with missiles) that is overrun by the endless tide of zombies in which almost everyone died.

|- style="vertical-align:top;"
|Game
|2012
|Eco
|Oil Rush|
|A PC strategy game, where ice caps have melted to cause global flooding.

|- style="vertical-align:top;"
|Game
|2012
|Unspecified
|Tokyo Jungle|
|A PlayStation 3 video game about a futuristic Tokyo that has become deserted by humans and overrun by many types of animals.

|- style="vertical-align:top;"
|Game
|2012
|Disease
|Zero Escape: Virtue's Last Reward|
|Visual novel adventure game released for Nintendo 3DS and PlayStation Vita. The game takes place 45 years in the future, after a calamitous virus outbreak, known as Radical-6, has exterminated almost all of human civilization.

|- style="vertical-align:top;"
|Web series
|2012
|War
|Electric City|Tom Hanks
|Animated web series created by and starring Hanks

|- style="vertical-align:top;"
|Film
|2013
|Zombies
|Cargo
|
|A father tries to protect his infant daughter as he turns into a zombie during the zombie apocalypse. A short film on which the longer one of the same name was based.

|- style="vertical-align:top;"
|Television
|2013
|War, Supernatural
|From the New World/Shin Sekai Yori|
|A millennium from now, in Japan, exists a utopia. The protagonist, Saki Watanabe, lives in an idyllic village barred from the outside world. Her world is ruled by the people who possess the "gods' power" of psychokinesis.

|- style="vertical-align:top;"
|Film
|2013
|Aliens
|Oblivion|
|Earth has been ravaged from war 60 years prior with the extraterrestrial "Scavengers"

|- style="vertical-align:top;"
|Film
|2013
|Aliens
|The Host|
|Earth's population has been almost entirely taken over by alien parasites that created a perfect planet

|- style="vertical-align:top;"
|Film
|2013
|Technology
|The World's End|
|Human civilization is replaced by synthetic replicas that never age. When the last biological humans who are drunk from drinking too much beer confront the supreme intelligence with the possibilities that humanity might not want to be "improved", this contradiction leads to a crash in the simulant network, destroying most of the world as a result and throwing the planet into a new Dark Age without technology.

|- style="vertical-align:top;"
|Game
|2013
|Disease, monsters
|The Last of Us|
|A fungal spore infection turns most of humanity into monsters and a small band of survivors try to live on.

|- style="vertical-align:top;"
|Film
|2013
|Environmental cataclysm forces
|After Earth|
|Humans abandon Earth.

|- style="vertical-align:top;"
|Film
|2013
|Eco
|The Colony|
|Another ice age causes survivors to move underground.

|- style="vertical-align:top;"
|Film
|2013
|Supernatural
|This Is the End|
|The Rapture occurs during a party attended by celebrities including Seth Rogen, James Franco, Jonah Hill, Jay Baruchel, Danny McBride, Craig Robinson, and Emma Watson.

|- style="vertical-align:top;"
|Film
|2013
|Disease
|Warm Bodies|
|A disease transforms many humans into zombies and isolates them from society, despite a lot of them managing to retain most of their consciousness.

|- style="vertical-align:top;"
|Webcomic
|2013
|Disease
|Stand Still, Stay Silent|
|Set in post-apocalyptic Scandinavia, the webcomic incorporates Norse mythology, focusing on an adventure into the external "silent world".

|- style="vertical-align:top;"
|Film
|2013
|Sun
|Exploding Sun|
|

|- style="vertical-align:top;"
|Novel
|2014
|Disease
|Dawn of the Planet of the Apes: Firestorm
|Greg Keyes
|Prequel to Dawn of the Planet of the Apes. A group of hyper-intelligent apes take refuge in the vast redwood forest known as Muir Woods while humanity battles the "Simian Flu" pandemic.

|- style="vertical-align:top;"
|Game
|2014
|Disease, Social Collapse
|Eidolon|
|Video game by Ice Water Games. The destruction of lifespan-extending technology installed in major cities led to massive outbreaks of fatal illness, followed by wider social collapse.

|- style="vertical-align:top;"
|Television
|2014
|War
|Die Gstettensaga: The Rise of Echsenfriedl|
|Absurdist sci-fi comedy film. The growing tension between the last two remaining superpowers – China and Google – escalates in the early 21st century, and results in the global inferno of the "Google Wars".

|- style="vertical-align:top;"
|Film
|2014
|War, Technology
|X-Men: Days of Future Past|
|Machines built to identify and eliminate mutants eventually target most humans as well. With much of the world destroyed, one mutant is sent back in time to try to prevent this future from ever happening.

|- style="vertical-align:top;"
|Television
|2014–
|Zombies
|Z Nation|
|A Syfy series focused on the days after a zombie apocalypse has killed most of the world's population. One man was experimented on before society's collapse and his body contains the only known antibodies to the zombie virus.

|- style="vertical-align:top;"
|Television
|2014–2020
|War
|The 100|
|The only survivors of a nuclear war live in a space station, which is falling apart. 100 of their teenagers are sent back to Earth's surface to determine if it is livable, only to discover that they are not the only survivors.

|- style="vertical-align:top;"
|Film
|2014
|Eco, technology
|Snowpiercer|
|Takes place in an alternative history where an attempt to counteract global warming through climate engineering in 2014 backfires catastrophically, causing an ice age and extinguishing nearly all life; only animals that can adapt to sub-zero temperatures and the inhabitants of a circumnavigational train called Snowpiercer remain.

|- style="vertical-align:top;"
|Film
|2014
|Zombies
|Wyrmwood|
|After a meteor shower turns everyone with a blood type other than A− into zombies, a man searches for his sister who's the subject of experimentation by a sadistic scientist.

|- style="vertical-align:top;"
|Film
|2014
|Disease
|Dawn of the Planet of the Apes|
|Directed by Matt Reeves, and based on characters created by Rick Jaffa and Amanda Silver (premise suggested by Planet of the Apes by Pierre Boulle). A growing nation of genetically evolved apes is threatened by a band of human survivors of a devastating virus unleashed a decade earlier.

|- style="vertical-align:top;"
|Television
|2014–2017
|Disease
|The Strain|
|Following a viral outbreak that has similarities to an ancient strain of vampirism, a CDC team works to defeat the virus as it spreads

|-
|Television
|2014–2017
|Supernatural
|The Leftovers|Damon Lindelof
|Series based on the Tom Perrota novel that takes place a few years after a rapture-type event.

|-
|Comic
|2014–2018
|War
|Girls' Last Tour|
|The series follows two girls, Yuuri and Chito, as they navigate the ruins of civilization after an unknown apocalypse, and as they travel in their modified Kettenkrad, they seek food and supplies while surviving day-to-day.

|- style="vertical-align:top;"
|Game
|2014
|Impact event
|Ace Combat Infinity|
|PlayStation 3 online game depicting a new world war 20 years after a meteor strike hits much of the Earth's surface

|-
|Television
|2014–2018
|Disease
|The Last Ship|
|Based on the 1988 novel of the same name by William Brinkle, the show follows the crew (consisting of 218 people) of a lone unaffected U.S. Navy Arleigh Burke-class guided missile destroyer, the fictional USS Nathan James (DDG-151), as it tries to find a cure for a global viral pandemic that wiped out over 80% of the world's population, stop the virus, and save humanity.

|- style="vertical-align:top;"
|Television
|2015–
|Zombies
|Fear the Walking Dead|
|A television series featuring the world overrun by zombies; spin-off of The Walking Dead|- style="vertical-align:top;"
|Film
|2015
|War
|Turbo Kid|
|

|- style="vertical-align:top;"
|Film
|2015
|Disease
|Astraea|
|Four people, including a telepathic teen, try to navigate grief, loneliness and love in a world where seemingly everyone else has died.

|- style="vertical-align:top;"
|Novel
|2015
|Eco
|The Water Knife|Paolo Bacigalupi
|Southwestern United States suffer social collapse because of a water shortage

|- style="vertical-align:top;"
|Film
|2015
|Disease
|I Am Alone|
|While filming a survival show a survival expert is bitten by a person infected with a zombie virus.

|- style="vertical-align:top;"
|Game
|2015
|War
|Mad Max|
|An action-adventure game based on the Mad Max franchise.

|- style="vertical-align:top;"
|Film
|2015
|War
|Mad Max: Fury Road|
|The fourth installment in the Mad Max series. This film follows the titular character who ends up in the fight between Immortan Joe, who rules as a god out of his settlement the Citadel, with his War Boys against Furiosa, one of his lieutenants. This movie features a change in actors for Max with this movie starring Tom Hardy.

|- style="vertical-align:top;"
|Film
|2015
|Eco
|San Andreas|
|Its plot centers on an earthquake caused by the San Andreas Fault devastating Los Angeles and the San Francisco Bay Area.

|- style="vertical-align:top;"
|Film
|2015
|Disease 
|Embers|
|After a global neurological epidemic, those who remain search for meaning and connection in a world without memory.

|- style="vertical-align:top;"
|Television
|2015-2017
|Eco
|Zoo 
|
|Based on the James Patterson book. Due to human activities, animals become more aggressive and begin killing humans

|- style="vertical-align:top;"
|Television
|2015–2018
|Disease
|The Last Man on Earth|
|Post-apocalyptic sci-fi dark comedy TV series, created by Will Forte (who also starred in the show) which formerly aired over the FOX broadcast TV network

|- style="vertical-align:top;"
|Television
|2015-2018
|Disease 
|12 Monkeys|
|A time traveler from the post-apocalyptic future arrives in the year 2015 on a mission to save mankind from a deadly plague. Based on the 1995 Terry Gilliam film.

|- style="vertical-align:top;"
|Song
|2015
|War, Technology
|The Globalist|
|Song by the band Muse from the album called "Drones"

|- style="vertical-align:top;"
|Film
|2015
|War
|Z for Zachariah|
|Feature film adaptation of the 1975 novel of the same name

|- style="vertical-align:top;"
|Comic
|2016–19
|Technology, monsters
|Scooby Apocalypse|
|Scooby-Doo and his friends have to find a cure for a nanite virus that they accidentally created in an experiment gone wrong that led to a mutant apocalypse.

|- style="vertical-align:top;"
|Film
|2016
|Aliens
|The 5th Wave|
|16-year-old Cassie Sullivan tries to survive in a world devastated by the waves of alien invasions that have decimated the Earth's population.

|- style="vertical-align:top;"
|Comic
|2016–
|Unspecified
|Liberty: Deception|Travis Vengroff
|A graphic novel and podcast series set on a failed terraforming colony. The series focuses on the daily struggle to survive on a distant planet with extreme resource scarcity.

|- style="vertical-align:top;"
|Television
|2016
|Disease
|Containment|
|The series follows an epidemic that breaks out in Atlanta, leaving a section of the city cordoned off under quarantine and those stuck on the inside fighting for their lives.

|- style="vertical-align:top;"
|Game
|2016
|Other
|Nuclear Throne|
|A post-apocalyptic shoot-'em-up by Vlambeer, where humanity mutated into horrible monsters. These mutants are looking for the fabled Nuclear Throne.

|- style="vertical-align:top;"
|Film
|2016
|Zombies
|Train to Busan|
|Passengers on a train to Busan try to survive a zombie outbreak.

|- style="vertical-align:top;"
|Film
|2016
|Disease, Zombies
|The Girl with All the Gifts|
|Based on the novel of the same name.

|- style="vertical-align:top;"
|Film
|2017
|Unspecified
|Bokeh|
|An American couple on holiday in Iceland wake up one morning to discover that every other human on earth has disappeared.

|- style="vertical-align:top;"
|Television
|2017
|Technology
|Black Mirror|
|The episode "Metalhead" is about a group of post-apocalyptic survivors being pursued by an AI robot dog.

|- style="vertical-align:top;"
|Television
|2017–2018
|Impact Event
|Salvation|
|TV show about the discovery of an asteroid that will impact the Earth in just six months.

|- style="vertical-align:top;"
|Game
|2017
|Infection, Disease
|Hollow Knight|
|Hollow Knight is an artistically dynamic adventure metroid-style game. It indirectly tells the story of a broken and diseased civilization through dialogue, lore tablets, artwork and other features. As the player learns more and progresses, the infection occurs, and ultimately the player discovers the source of the infection as well as the history behind the world.

|- style="vertical-align:top;"
|Film
|2017
|Zombies
|Cargo
|
|A father tries to protect his infant daughter as he turns into a zombie during the zombie apocalypse.

|- style="vertical-align:top;"
|Game
|2017
|Supernatural, technology
|The Legend of Zelda: Breath of the Wild|
|Set 100 years after Hyrule has been largely destroyed by Ganon

|- style="vertical-align:top;"
|Game
|2017
|Technology, war
|Horizon Zero Dawn|
|The story is set in the 31st century, in a world where humans have regressed to primitive tribal societies as a result of some unspecified calamity. Their technologically advanced predecessors are vaguely remembered as the "Old Ones." Large robotic creatures known merely as "machines" now dominate the Earth.

|- style="vertical-align:top;"
|Film
|2017-2018
|Monsters
|Godzilla: Planet of the Monsters|
|Humans are forced to evacuate Earth when several Kaiju including Godzilla surface and wreak havoc across the Earth. 20,000 years later they return after failing to find another habitable planet in order to reclaim the Earth and destroy Godzilla, however they discover that the planet has changed drastically in humanity’s absence. Was followed by two sequels Godzilla: City on the Edge of Battle and Godzilla: The Planet Eater.

|- style="vertical-align:top;"
|Film
|2017
|Bioterrorism, zombies
|Resident Evil: Vendetta|
|The story is set in between the events of Resident Evil 6 and Resident Evil 7: Biohazard. BSAA agent Chris Redfield is tracking Glenn Arias, a Brazilian-American death merchant and a former CIA operative who is wanted by both the Interpol and the FBI.

|- style="vertical-align:top;"
|Television
|2017-2020
|Nuclear
|Dark (TV series)|
|Time travel causes a nuclear meltdown.

|- style="vertical-align:top;"
|Film
|2017
|Unspecified
|Everything Beautiful Is Far Away (film)|
|The story is set in the vast desert that exists between the few remaining cities.

|- style="vertical-align:top;"
|Television
|2017–2018
|Technology
|Agents of S.H.I.E.L.D. season 5
|
|Glenn Talbot, under the corrupting influence of gravitonium, inadvertently destroys Earth in a careless attempt to mine more of the substance, forcing humanity's survivors into the Lighthouse, a subterranean bunker under Lake Ontario. The first arc of the season involves S.H.I.E.L.D. discovering the aftermath of this imminent calamity—unaware of Talbot's involvement due to his name becoming lost to history and Daisy Johnson being scapegoated—while the second arc involves S.H.I.E.L.D.'s ultimately successful attempt to prevent this from happening.

|- style="vertical-align:top;"
|Film
|2018
|Aliens
|A Quiet Place|
|A family is struggling to survive in a post-apocalyptic world inhabited by blind extraterrestrial creatures with an acute sense of hearing.

|- style="vertical-align:top;"
|Film
|2018
|Supernatural, Monsters
|Bird Box|
|A woman tries to protect herself and two children from supernatural creatures that make people who look at them go insane and commit suicide.

|- style="vertical-align:top;"
|Film
|2018
|Disease
|What Still Remains|
|A young woman tries to navigate a world ravaged by a virus after the death of her mother.

|- style="vertical-align:top;"
|Film
|2018
|Zombies
||
|Two young women try to travel between the two safe areas in Germany following a zombie apocalypse

|- style="vertical-align:top;"
|Television
|2018-19
|Disease
|The Rain|
|Survivors of a virus carried by rainfall search for their father.

|- style="vertical-align:top;"
|Television
|2018
|War, supernatural
|American Horror Story: Apocalypse|
|The 8th season of American Horror Story|- style="vertical-align:top;"
|Film
|2019
|Eco
|Io|
|The earth’s atmosphere becomes toxic and forces the majority of humanity off-world to a space station colony near one of Jupiter’s moons. A young scientist who holds out hope of finding a solution meets a man who is on his way to the last evacuation shuttle.

|- style="vertical-align:top;"
|Film
|2019
|Aliens
|Avengers: Endgame|
|The surviving members of the Avengers and their allies attempt to reverse the damage caused in Avengers: Infinity War when Thanos used the Infinity Gems to kill half of the universe's population.

|- style="vertical-align:top;"
|Television
|2019
|Disease
|See|
|In the distant future, the human race has lost the sense of sight, and society is left to find new ways to interact, build, hunt, and survive.

|- style="vertical-align:top;"
|Television
|2019
|War
|Daybreak|
|A teenager searches for his girlfriend in post-apocalyptic California

|- style="vertical-align:top;"
|Game
|2019
|War
|Far Cry New Dawn|
|The narrative stand-alone sequel of Far Cry 5 of the Far Cry video game series. The story is set 17 years after the events of Far Cry 5. After the nuclear exchange known as "the Collapse" devastated the world, survivors attempt to rebuild the community in Hope County. Their efforts are, however, threatened by the Highwaymen, a roving band of organized bandits led by twin sisters Mickey and Lou.

|- style="vertical-align:top;"
|Film
|2019
|Technology
|I Am Mother|
|After an extinction event, an AI begins the process of repopulating the Earth using stored embryos.

|- style="vertical-align:top;"
|Film
|2019
|Aliens
|The Lego Movie 2: The Second Part|
|Emmet Brickowski attempts to rescue his friends from the Systar System, while dealing with a coming cataclysm known as "Armamageddon".

|- style="vertical-align:top;"
|Television
|2019
|Zombies
|Black Summer|
|In the same universe as Z Nation, this show follows a small group of refugees trying to make it to safety six weeks after the start of the zombie apocalypse.

|- style="vertical-align:top;"
|Televsion
|2019-2021
|Monsters, Zombies
|The Last Kids on Earth|
|A group of teenagers band together when their hometown is overrun by giant monsters and zombies after portals to another dimension open in the sky. Based on the book series of the same name.

|- style="vertical-align:top;"
|Film
|2019
|Zombies
|Zombieland: Double Tap|
|A sequel to Zombieland, set 10 years later.

|- style="vertical-align:top;"
|Television
|2019-2022
|Unspecified
|Three Robots, Three Robots: Exit Strategies|
|Part of the Love, Death & Robots anthology series, it follows three robots as they explore Earth after the fall of humanity.

|- style="vertical-align:top;"
|Television
|2019
|Unspecified
|Alternate Histories|
|Part of the Love, Death & Robots anthology series. An alternative history research simulation app, shows a user six different timelines involving the death of Adolf Hitler in 1908 instead of 1945, some of which result in post-apocalyptic scenarios.

|- style="vertical-align:top;"
|Film
|2019
|Disease
|Light of My Life|
|A father and his daughter try to stay safe 10 years after a plague kills off most women

|- style="vertical-align:top;"
|Film
|2019
|Aliens
|Avengers: Endgame|
|The surviving members of the Avengers and their allies attempt to reverse the damage caused in Avengers: Infinity War when Thanos used the Infinity Gems to kill half of the universe's population.

|- style="vertical-align:top;"
|Game
|2019
|Supernatural
|Death Stranding|
| In the near future an extinction level event has had catastrophic  effects on the human race, leaving the small colonies of survivors scattered and disconnected.

|- style="vertical-align:top;"
|Film
|2020
|Monsters
|Love and Monsters|
|Fallout from nuclear bombs used to destroy an asteroid causes all cold-blooded animals to mutate into giant monsters that kill the majority of the human race.

|- style="vertical-align:top;"
|Film
|2020
|Aliens
|Justice League Dark: Apokolips War|
|After a poorly executed plan leaves numerous heroes dead, Earth is conquered by Darkseid, with most cities rendered a wasteland. Although the surviving heroes manage to defeat Darkseid in the end, however, the damage is already done; one-third of the Earth's core has been successfully mined by the Reapers, putting its orbit in danger of freezing or heating enough that the planet's surface will become uninhabitable. John Constantine convinces a reluctant Flash to create a second Flashpoint (after learning that he created the first while freeing him on Apokolips) to undo the destruction despite the fact that the world will not be the same as it was before. Flash runs back in time and creates a second Flashpoint. Damian and Raven share their first and last kiss, while the Justice League observes a wide bright light from beyond the horizon covering the whole world as the timeline resets, leaving their fates unknown.

|- style="vertical-align:top;"
|Film
|2020
|War
|Friend of the World|
|A young filmmaker crosses paths with aberrant war general in a military bunker during the aftermath of a global war.

|- style="vertical-align:top;"
|Film
|2020
|Robots
|Kimmy vs. the Reverend|
|In one possible ending in the "choose your own adventure" format show, reached when the viewer chooses to wait for the Uber driver Mamadou twice in a row, humanity is wiped out by an army of C.H.E.R.Y.L robots.

|- style="vertical-align:top;"
|Television
|2020–2021
|Zombies
|The Walking Dead: World Beyond|
|A spin-off of The Walking Dead, set 10 years after the original series.

|- style="vertical-align:top;"
|Film
|2021
|Impact event
|How It Ends|
| On the final day before a meteorite is going to collide with earth, a woman traverses through the empty streets of Los Angeles with a Metaphysical version of her younger self on the way to an “End of the World” party.

|- style="vertical-align:top;"
|Film
|2021
|Robots
|The Mitchells vs. the Machines|
|A dysfunctional family must save Earth from a robot uprising while on a road trip.

|- style="vertical-align:top;"
|Film
|2021
|Sun
|Finch|
|Fifteen years after a solar flare has destroyed the earth’s ozone layer, an Ailing engineer builds an android companion to help look after his dog, but when a massive storm approaches they are forced to make a cross-country road trip across post-apocalyptic America.

|- style="vertical-align:top;"
|Film
|2021
|Impact event
|Don't Look Up|
|A satirical look at America's reaction to an approaching comet. The story is an allegory for climate change.

|- style="vertical-align:top;"
|Television
|2023
|Disease, monsters
|The Last of Us''
|
|A TV series adaptation of the video game of the same title.
|}

See also
 List of apocalyptic films
 List of nuclear holocaust fiction
 List of time travel science fiction
 Nuclear holocaust
 Nuclear weapons in popular culture
 Survivalism
 Survivalism in fiction
 World War III
 World War III in popular culture
 Zombie apocalypse

References

External links

 Quiet Earth – A website dedicated to post apocalyptic media
 Empty World: Apocalyptic and End of the World Fiction, Film and TV
 Surviving Armageddon: Beyond the Imagination of Disaster – article by Mick Broderick in Science Fiction Studies.
 List of songs related to World War III and nuclear war
 Post-Apocalyptic Audio Dramas – Archive.org compilation of post-apocalyptic radio shows and audio dramas in the public domain or released under a Creative Commons license

Science fiction bibliographies